

244001–244100 

|-bgcolor=#E9E9E9
| 244001 ||  || — || September 16, 2001 || Socorro || LINEAR || — || align=right | 3.3 km || 
|-id=002 bgcolor=#E9E9E9
| 244002 ||  || — || September 16, 2001 || Socorro || LINEAR || AEO || align=right | 2.3 km || 
|-id=003 bgcolor=#E9E9E9
| 244003 ||  || — || September 16, 2001 || Socorro || LINEAR || — || align=right | 3.7 km || 
|-id=004 bgcolor=#E9E9E9
| 244004 ||  || — || September 16, 2001 || Socorro || LINEAR || — || align=right | 2.4 km || 
|-id=005 bgcolor=#fefefe
| 244005 ||  || — || September 17, 2001 || Socorro || LINEAR || FLO || align=right data-sort-value="0.98" | 980 m || 
|-id=006 bgcolor=#d6d6d6
| 244006 ||  || — || September 17, 2001 || Socorro || LINEAR || EUP || align=right | 5.7 km || 
|-id=007 bgcolor=#fefefe
| 244007 ||  || — || September 19, 2001 || Socorro || LINEAR || — || align=right data-sort-value="0.69" | 690 m || 
|-id=008 bgcolor=#fefefe
| 244008 ||  || — || September 20, 2001 || Socorro || LINEAR || — || align=right | 1.1 km || 
|-id=009 bgcolor=#d6d6d6
| 244009 ||  || — || September 20, 2001 || Socorro || LINEAR || — || align=right | 3.6 km || 
|-id=010 bgcolor=#d6d6d6
| 244010 ||  || — || September 20, 2001 || Socorro || LINEAR || — || align=right | 5.1 km || 
|-id=011 bgcolor=#fefefe
| 244011 ||  || — || September 20, 2001 || Socorro || LINEAR || V || align=right | 1.0 km || 
|-id=012 bgcolor=#fefefe
| 244012 ||  || — || September 20, 2001 || Desert Eagle || W. K. Y. Yeung || FLO || align=right data-sort-value="0.81" | 810 m || 
|-id=013 bgcolor=#d6d6d6
| 244013 ||  || — || September 20, 2001 || Desert Eagle || W. K. Y. Yeung || — || align=right | 4.8 km || 
|-id=014 bgcolor=#d6d6d6
| 244014 ||  || — || September 16, 2001 || Socorro || LINEAR || — || align=right | 4.2 km || 
|-id=015 bgcolor=#E9E9E9
| 244015 ||  || — || September 16, 2001 || Socorro || LINEAR || — || align=right | 1.9 km || 
|-id=016 bgcolor=#E9E9E9
| 244016 ||  || — || September 16, 2001 || Socorro || LINEAR || DOR || align=right | 3.7 km || 
|-id=017 bgcolor=#E9E9E9
| 244017 ||  || — || September 16, 2001 || Socorro || LINEAR || — || align=right | 3.4 km || 
|-id=018 bgcolor=#d6d6d6
| 244018 ||  || — || September 16, 2001 || Socorro || LINEAR || — || align=right | 5.1 km || 
|-id=019 bgcolor=#E9E9E9
| 244019 ||  || — || September 16, 2001 || Socorro || LINEAR || — || align=right | 2.4 km || 
|-id=020 bgcolor=#d6d6d6
| 244020 ||  || — || September 16, 2001 || Socorro || LINEAR || — || align=right | 3.5 km || 
|-id=021 bgcolor=#d6d6d6
| 244021 ||  || — || September 16, 2001 || Socorro || LINEAR || ALA || align=right | 5.4 km || 
|-id=022 bgcolor=#E9E9E9
| 244022 ||  || — || September 16, 2001 || Socorro || LINEAR || HEN || align=right | 2.8 km || 
|-id=023 bgcolor=#fefefe
| 244023 ||  || — || September 17, 2001 || Socorro || LINEAR || — || align=right | 1.0 km || 
|-id=024 bgcolor=#fefefe
| 244024 ||  || — || September 17, 2001 || Socorro || LINEAR || — || align=right data-sort-value="0.96" | 960 m || 
|-id=025 bgcolor=#fefefe
| 244025 ||  || — || September 17, 2001 || Socorro || LINEAR || — || align=right | 1.0 km || 
|-id=026 bgcolor=#E9E9E9
| 244026 ||  || — || September 17, 2001 || Socorro || LINEAR || — || align=right | 2.2 km || 
|-id=027 bgcolor=#fefefe
| 244027 ||  || — || September 16, 2001 || Socorro || LINEAR || V || align=right data-sort-value="0.82" | 820 m || 
|-id=028 bgcolor=#d6d6d6
| 244028 ||  || — || September 19, 2001 || Socorro || LINEAR || URS || align=right | 5.9 km || 
|-id=029 bgcolor=#d6d6d6
| 244029 ||  || — || September 19, 2001 || Socorro || LINEAR || — || align=right | 5.1 km || 
|-id=030 bgcolor=#E9E9E9
| 244030 ||  || — || September 19, 2001 || Socorro || LINEAR || — || align=right | 2.7 km || 
|-id=031 bgcolor=#d6d6d6
| 244031 ||  || — || September 19, 2001 || Socorro || LINEAR || TRE || align=right | 3.2 km || 
|-id=032 bgcolor=#fefefe
| 244032 ||  || — || September 19, 2001 || Socorro || LINEAR || FLO || align=right data-sort-value="0.79" | 790 m || 
|-id=033 bgcolor=#fefefe
| 244033 ||  || — || September 19, 2001 || Socorro || LINEAR || — || align=right | 1.3 km || 
|-id=034 bgcolor=#fefefe
| 244034 ||  || — || September 19, 2001 || Socorro || LINEAR || NYS || align=right | 1.0 km || 
|-id=035 bgcolor=#fefefe
| 244035 ||  || — || September 19, 2001 || Socorro || LINEAR || MAS || align=right data-sort-value="0.96" | 960 m || 
|-id=036 bgcolor=#E9E9E9
| 244036 ||  || — || September 19, 2001 || Socorro || LINEAR || — || align=right | 3.0 km || 
|-id=037 bgcolor=#d6d6d6
| 244037 ||  || — || September 20, 2001 || Socorro || LINEAR || — || align=right | 4.0 km || 
|-id=038 bgcolor=#fefefe
| 244038 ||  || — || September 21, 2001 || Kitt Peak || Spacewatch || — || align=right | 1.3 km || 
|-id=039 bgcolor=#fefefe
| 244039 ||  || — || September 28, 2001 || Palomar || NEAT || — || align=right | 1.3 km || 
|-id=040 bgcolor=#d6d6d6
| 244040 ||  || — || September 20, 2001 || Socorro || LINEAR || EMA || align=right | 5.3 km || 
|-id=041 bgcolor=#d6d6d6
| 244041 ||  || — || September 18, 2001 || Anderson Mesa || LONEOS || — || align=right | 4.0 km || 
|-id=042 bgcolor=#d6d6d6
| 244042 ||  || — || September 19, 2001 || Socorro || LINEAR || EOS || align=right | 3.0 km || 
|-id=043 bgcolor=#d6d6d6
| 244043 ||  || — || September 20, 2001 || Kitt Peak || Spacewatch || — || align=right | 3.6 km || 
|-id=044 bgcolor=#d6d6d6
| 244044 ||  || — || September 23, 2001 || Palomar || NEAT || AEG || align=right | 4.0 km || 
|-id=045 bgcolor=#d6d6d6
| 244045 ||  || — || September 26, 2001 || Socorro || LINEAR || EOS || align=right | 2.7 km || 
|-id=046 bgcolor=#d6d6d6
| 244046 ||  || — || September 29, 2001 || Palomar || NEAT || — || align=right | 4.8 km || 
|-id=047 bgcolor=#d6d6d6
| 244047 ||  || — || October 10, 2001 || Palomar || NEAT || EOS || align=right | 2.7 km || 
|-id=048 bgcolor=#fefefe
| 244048 ||  || — || October 9, 2001 || Socorro || LINEAR || FLO || align=right | 1.1 km || 
|-id=049 bgcolor=#FA8072
| 244049 ||  || — || October 14, 2001 || Socorro || LINEAR || — || align=right data-sort-value="0.97" | 970 m || 
|-id=050 bgcolor=#fefefe
| 244050 ||  || — || October 14, 2001 || Socorro || LINEAR || — || align=right | 1.2 km || 
|-id=051 bgcolor=#fefefe
| 244051 ||  || — || October 14, 2001 || Socorro || LINEAR || SUL || align=right | 3.6 km || 
|-id=052 bgcolor=#d6d6d6
| 244052 ||  || — || October 14, 2001 || Socorro || LINEAR || — || align=right | 3.4 km || 
|-id=053 bgcolor=#fefefe
| 244053 ||  || — || October 14, 2001 || Cima Ekar || ADAS || — || align=right | 1.3 km || 
|-id=054 bgcolor=#fefefe
| 244054 ||  || — || October 13, 2001 || Socorro || LINEAR || — || align=right | 1.7 km || 
|-id=055 bgcolor=#d6d6d6
| 244055 ||  || — || October 13, 2001 || Socorro || LINEAR || — || align=right | 4.9 km || 
|-id=056 bgcolor=#d6d6d6
| 244056 ||  || — || October 13, 2001 || Socorro || LINEAR || — || align=right | 4.8 km || 
|-id=057 bgcolor=#fefefe
| 244057 ||  || — || October 14, 2001 || Socorro || LINEAR || — || align=right | 1.1 km || 
|-id=058 bgcolor=#fefefe
| 244058 ||  || — || October 14, 2001 || Socorro || LINEAR || — || align=right | 1.1 km || 
|-id=059 bgcolor=#d6d6d6
| 244059 ||  || — || October 14, 2001 || Socorro || LINEAR || EOS || align=right | 2.9 km || 
|-id=060 bgcolor=#d6d6d6
| 244060 ||  || — || October 14, 2001 || Socorro || LINEAR || — || align=right | 5.5 km || 
|-id=061 bgcolor=#d6d6d6
| 244061 ||  || — || October 14, 2001 || Socorro || LINEAR || EOS || align=right | 2.6 km || 
|-id=062 bgcolor=#fefefe
| 244062 ||  || — || October 14, 2001 || Socorro || LINEAR || — || align=right | 1.9 km || 
|-id=063 bgcolor=#d6d6d6
| 244063 ||  || — || October 14, 2001 || Socorro || LINEAR || — || align=right | 5.1 km || 
|-id=064 bgcolor=#E9E9E9
| 244064 ||  || — || October 15, 2001 || Socorro || LINEAR || — || align=right | 1.7 km || 
|-id=065 bgcolor=#d6d6d6
| 244065 ||  || — || October 15, 2001 || Socorro || LINEAR || — || align=right | 8.3 km || 
|-id=066 bgcolor=#d6d6d6
| 244066 ||  || — || October 15, 2001 || Kitt Peak || Spacewatch || TRE || align=right | 3.3 km || 
|-id=067 bgcolor=#d6d6d6
| 244067 ||  || — || October 15, 2001 || Kitt Peak || Spacewatch || EOS || align=right | 2.5 km || 
|-id=068 bgcolor=#fefefe
| 244068 ||  || — || October 13, 2001 || Palomar || NEAT || — || align=right | 2.2 km || 
|-id=069 bgcolor=#fefefe
| 244069 ||  || — || October 10, 2001 || Palomar || NEAT || — || align=right | 1.3 km || 
|-id=070 bgcolor=#d6d6d6
| 244070 ||  || — || October 11, 2001 || Palomar || NEAT || EUP || align=right | 6.8 km || 
|-id=071 bgcolor=#fefefe
| 244071 ||  || — || October 15, 2001 || Socorro || LINEAR || — || align=right | 1.4 km || 
|-id=072 bgcolor=#fefefe
| 244072 ||  || — || October 14, 2001 || Socorro || LINEAR || — || align=right data-sort-value="0.99" | 990 m || 
|-id=073 bgcolor=#d6d6d6
| 244073 ||  || — || October 14, 2001 || Socorro || LINEAR || EOS || align=right | 2.9 km || 
|-id=074 bgcolor=#d6d6d6
| 244074 ||  || — || October 14, 2001 || Socorro || LINEAR || — || align=right | 5.0 km || 
|-id=075 bgcolor=#d6d6d6
| 244075 ||  || — || October 11, 2001 || Socorro || LINEAR || EOS || align=right | 3.1 km || 
|-id=076 bgcolor=#E9E9E9
| 244076 ||  || — || October 13, 2001 || Anderson Mesa || LONEOS || — || align=right | 2.0 km || 
|-id=077 bgcolor=#d6d6d6
| 244077 ||  || — || October 13, 2001 || Palomar || NEAT || — || align=right | 4.4 km || 
|-id=078 bgcolor=#fefefe
| 244078 ||  || — || October 15, 2001 || Palomar || NEAT || — || align=right | 2.4 km || 
|-id=079 bgcolor=#d6d6d6
| 244079 ||  || — || October 10, 2001 || Palomar || NEAT || — || align=right | 3.5 km || 
|-id=080 bgcolor=#fefefe
| 244080 ||  || — || October 15, 2001 || Palomar || NEAT || — || align=right | 1.1 km || 
|-id=081 bgcolor=#d6d6d6
| 244081 ||  || — || October 21, 2001 || Desert Eagle || W. K. Y. Yeung || — || align=right | 6.2 km || 
|-id=082 bgcolor=#fefefe
| 244082 ||  || — || October 17, 2001 || Socorro || LINEAR || — || align=right | 1.2 km || 
|-id=083 bgcolor=#E9E9E9
| 244083 ||  || — || October 17, 2001 || Socorro || LINEAR || — || align=right | 1.8 km || 
|-id=084 bgcolor=#fefefe
| 244084 ||  || — || October 16, 2001 || Socorro || LINEAR || — || align=right | 1.2 km || 
|-id=085 bgcolor=#d6d6d6
| 244085 ||  || — || October 17, 2001 || Socorro || LINEAR || — || align=right | 7.7 km || 
|-id=086 bgcolor=#E9E9E9
| 244086 ||  || — || October 17, 2001 || Socorro || LINEAR || CLO || align=right | 4.2 km || 
|-id=087 bgcolor=#fefefe
| 244087 ||  || — || October 17, 2001 || Socorro || LINEAR || — || align=right | 1.0 km || 
|-id=088 bgcolor=#E9E9E9
| 244088 ||  || — || October 18, 2001 || Socorro || LINEAR || — || align=right | 2.6 km || 
|-id=089 bgcolor=#d6d6d6
| 244089 ||  || — || October 18, 2001 || Socorro || LINEAR || — || align=right | 4.6 km || 
|-id=090 bgcolor=#d6d6d6
| 244090 ||  || — || October 20, 2001 || Socorro || LINEAR || — || align=right | 4.3 km || 
|-id=091 bgcolor=#E9E9E9
| 244091 ||  || — || October 17, 2001 || Socorro || LINEAR || — || align=right | 2.5 km || 
|-id=092 bgcolor=#d6d6d6
| 244092 ||  || — || October 20, 2001 || Socorro || LINEAR || EOS || align=right | 2.3 km || 
|-id=093 bgcolor=#d6d6d6
| 244093 ||  || — || October 20, 2001 || Socorro || LINEAR || — || align=right | 6.2 km || 
|-id=094 bgcolor=#fefefe
| 244094 ||  || — || October 17, 2001 || Socorro || LINEAR || V || align=right data-sort-value="0.97" | 970 m || 
|-id=095 bgcolor=#E9E9E9
| 244095 ||  || — || October 20, 2001 || Socorro || LINEAR || — || align=right | 2.6 km || 
|-id=096 bgcolor=#d6d6d6
| 244096 ||  || — || October 22, 2001 || Socorro || LINEAR || — || align=right | 4.4 km || 
|-id=097 bgcolor=#fefefe
| 244097 ||  || — || October 22, 2001 || Socorro || LINEAR || SUL || align=right | 3.4 km || 
|-id=098 bgcolor=#fefefe
| 244098 ||  || — || October 23, 2001 || Socorro || LINEAR || NYS || align=right data-sort-value="0.74" | 740 m || 
|-id=099 bgcolor=#E9E9E9
| 244099 ||  || — || October 23, 2001 || Socorro || LINEAR || HOF || align=right | 3.9 km || 
|-id=100 bgcolor=#d6d6d6
| 244100 ||  || — || October 23, 2001 || Socorro || LINEAR || HYG || align=right | 4.0 km || 
|}

244101–244200 

|-bgcolor=#E9E9E9
| 244101 ||  || — || October 23, 2001 || Socorro || LINEAR || HOF || align=right | 4.7 km || 
|-id=102 bgcolor=#d6d6d6
| 244102 ||  || — || October 23, 2001 || Socorro || LINEAR || MEL || align=right | 5.2 km || 
|-id=103 bgcolor=#fefefe
| 244103 ||  || — || October 24, 2001 || Socorro || LINEAR || ERI || align=right | 1.7 km || 
|-id=104 bgcolor=#d6d6d6
| 244104 ||  || — || October 16, 2001 || Kitt Peak || Spacewatch || — || align=right | 4.3 km || 
|-id=105 bgcolor=#E9E9E9
| 244105 ||  || — || October 17, 2001 || Socorro || LINEAR || — || align=right | 3.4 km || 
|-id=106 bgcolor=#E9E9E9
| 244106 ||  || — || October 18, 2001 || Socorro || LINEAR || — || align=right | 4.3 km || 
|-id=107 bgcolor=#d6d6d6
| 244107 ||  || — || October 18, 2001 || Palomar || NEAT || — || align=right | 4.3 km || 
|-id=108 bgcolor=#d6d6d6
| 244108 ||  || — || October 19, 2001 || Palomar || NEAT || VER || align=right | 5.0 km || 
|-id=109 bgcolor=#d6d6d6
| 244109 ||  || — || October 23, 2001 || Socorro || LINEAR || — || align=right | 4.1 km || 
|-id=110 bgcolor=#d6d6d6
| 244110 ||  || — || October 20, 2001 || Socorro || LINEAR || — || align=right | 4.0 km || 
|-id=111 bgcolor=#d6d6d6
| 244111 ||  || — || October 16, 2001 || Palomar || NEAT || EOS || align=right | 2.1 km || 
|-id=112 bgcolor=#d6d6d6
| 244112 ||  || — || October 16, 2001 || Palomar || NEAT || — || align=right | 2.8 km || 
|-id=113 bgcolor=#E9E9E9
| 244113 ||  || — || November 11, 2001 || Kitt Peak || Spacewatch || — || align=right | 3.7 km || 
|-id=114 bgcolor=#E9E9E9
| 244114 ||  || — || November 11, 2001 || Kitt Peak || Spacewatch || HNA || align=right | 2.8 km || 
|-id=115 bgcolor=#FA8072
| 244115 ||  || — || November 11, 2001 || Socorro || LINEAR || — || align=right | 1.9 km || 
|-id=116 bgcolor=#d6d6d6
| 244116 ||  || — || November 9, 2001 || Socorro || LINEAR || — || align=right | 4.6 km || 
|-id=117 bgcolor=#E9E9E9
| 244117 ||  || — || November 10, 2001 || Socorro || LINEAR || POS || align=right | 4.4 km || 
|-id=118 bgcolor=#d6d6d6
| 244118 ||  || — || November 10, 2001 || Socorro || LINEAR || Tj (2.99) || align=right | 6.5 km || 
|-id=119 bgcolor=#d6d6d6
| 244119 ||  || — || November 10, 2001 || Palomar || NEAT || — || align=right | 4.7 km || 
|-id=120 bgcolor=#fefefe
| 244120 ||  || — || November 9, 2001 || Socorro || LINEAR || — || align=right | 1.2 km || 
|-id=121 bgcolor=#fefefe
| 244121 ||  || — || November 9, 2001 || Socorro || LINEAR || — || align=right | 1.2 km || 
|-id=122 bgcolor=#d6d6d6
| 244122 ||  || — || November 9, 2001 || Socorro || LINEAR || — || align=right | 3.5 km || 
|-id=123 bgcolor=#d6d6d6
| 244123 ||  || — || November 9, 2001 || Socorro || LINEAR || — || align=right | 6.0 km || 
|-id=124 bgcolor=#E9E9E9
| 244124 ||  || — || November 9, 2001 || Socorro || LINEAR || — || align=right | 4.5 km || 
|-id=125 bgcolor=#E9E9E9
| 244125 ||  || — || November 9, 2001 || Socorro || LINEAR || — || align=right | 3.2 km || 
|-id=126 bgcolor=#E9E9E9
| 244126 ||  || — || November 9, 2001 || Socorro || LINEAR || — || align=right | 2.6 km || 
|-id=127 bgcolor=#fefefe
| 244127 ||  || — || November 9, 2001 || Socorro || LINEAR || — || align=right | 1.5 km || 
|-id=128 bgcolor=#fefefe
| 244128 ||  || — || November 10, 2001 || Socorro || LINEAR || FLO || align=right | 1.0 km || 
|-id=129 bgcolor=#E9E9E9
| 244129 ||  || — || November 10, 2001 || Socorro || LINEAR || DOR || align=right | 4.5 km || 
|-id=130 bgcolor=#d6d6d6
| 244130 ||  || — || November 10, 2001 || Socorro || LINEAR || — || align=right | 4.8 km || 
|-id=131 bgcolor=#fefefe
| 244131 ||  || — || November 10, 2001 || Socorro || LINEAR || FLO || align=right | 2.3 km || 
|-id=132 bgcolor=#fefefe
| 244132 ||  || — || November 10, 2001 || Socorro || LINEAR || ERI || align=right | 2.8 km || 
|-id=133 bgcolor=#d6d6d6
| 244133 ||  || — || November 10, 2001 || Socorro || LINEAR || EUP || align=right | 8.4 km || 
|-id=134 bgcolor=#fefefe
| 244134 ||  || — || November 12, 2001 || Socorro || LINEAR || — || align=right | 3.1 km || 
|-id=135 bgcolor=#E9E9E9
| 244135 ||  || — || November 12, 2001 || Socorro || LINEAR || — || align=right | 4.2 km || 
|-id=136 bgcolor=#d6d6d6
| 244136 ||  || — || November 12, 2001 || Socorro || LINEAR || — || align=right | 3.0 km || 
|-id=137 bgcolor=#d6d6d6
| 244137 ||  || — || November 12, 2001 || Socorro || LINEAR || EOS || align=right | 2.8 km || 
|-id=138 bgcolor=#fefefe
| 244138 ||  || — || November 9, 2001 || Socorro || LINEAR || NYS || align=right | 1.9 km || 
|-id=139 bgcolor=#d6d6d6
| 244139 ||  || — || November 9, 2001 || Socorro || LINEAR || — || align=right | 4.2 km || 
|-id=140 bgcolor=#d6d6d6
| 244140 ||  || — || November 12, 2001 || Socorro || LINEAR || — || align=right | 4.4 km || 
|-id=141 bgcolor=#d6d6d6
| 244141 ||  || — || November 16, 2001 || Kitt Peak || Spacewatch || EOS || align=right | 3.5 km || 
|-id=142 bgcolor=#fefefe
| 244142 ||  || — || November 16, 2001 || Kitt Peak || Spacewatch || — || align=right data-sort-value="0.98" | 980 m || 
|-id=143 bgcolor=#fefefe
| 244143 ||  || — || November 21, 2001 || Socorro || LINEAR || — || align=right data-sort-value="0.84" | 840 m || 
|-id=144 bgcolor=#fefefe
| 244144 ||  || — || November 17, 2001 || Anderson Mesa || LONEOS || H || align=right | 1.2 km || 
|-id=145 bgcolor=#d6d6d6
| 244145 ||  || — || November 17, 2001 || Socorro || LINEAR || — || align=right | 5.0 km || 
|-id=146 bgcolor=#fefefe
| 244146 ||  || — || November 17, 2001 || Kitt Peak || Spacewatch || FLO || align=right data-sort-value="0.77" | 770 m || 
|-id=147 bgcolor=#d6d6d6
| 244147 ||  || — || November 18, 2001 || Kitt Peak || Spacewatch || — || align=right | 2.2 km || 
|-id=148 bgcolor=#d6d6d6
| 244148 ||  || — || November 17, 2001 || Socorro || LINEAR || — || align=right | 4.1 km || 
|-id=149 bgcolor=#d6d6d6
| 244149 ||  || — || November 17, 2001 || Socorro || LINEAR || TEL || align=right | 2.0 km || 
|-id=150 bgcolor=#fefefe
| 244150 ||  || — || November 17, 2001 || Socorro || LINEAR || CHL || align=right | 2.2 km || 
|-id=151 bgcolor=#d6d6d6
| 244151 ||  || — || November 18, 2001 || Socorro || LINEAR || ARM || align=right | 5.5 km || 
|-id=152 bgcolor=#fefefe
| 244152 ||  || — || November 19, 2001 || Socorro || LINEAR || NYS || align=right data-sort-value="0.98" | 980 m || 
|-id=153 bgcolor=#E9E9E9
| 244153 ||  || — || November 19, 2001 || Socorro || LINEAR || HOF || align=right | 3.2 km || 
|-id=154 bgcolor=#d6d6d6
| 244154 ||  || — || November 19, 2001 || Socorro || LINEAR || — || align=right | 5.3 km || 
|-id=155 bgcolor=#d6d6d6
| 244155 ||  || — || November 20, 2001 || Socorro || LINEAR || — || align=right | 4.9 km || 
|-id=156 bgcolor=#d6d6d6
| 244156 ||  || — || November 20, 2001 || Socorro || LINEAR || HYG || align=right | 4.1 km || 
|-id=157 bgcolor=#E9E9E9
| 244157 ||  || — || November 21, 2001 || Socorro || LINEAR || — || align=right | 2.5 km || 
|-id=158 bgcolor=#fefefe
| 244158 ||  || — || November 17, 2001 || Kitt Peak || Spacewatch || MAS || align=right data-sort-value="0.68" | 680 m || 
|-id=159 bgcolor=#d6d6d6
| 244159 ||  || — || November 19, 2001 || Anderson Mesa || LONEOS || VER || align=right | 3.8 km || 
|-id=160 bgcolor=#fefefe
| 244160 ||  || — || December 8, 2001 || Socorro || LINEAR || — || align=right | 2.6 km || 
|-id=161 bgcolor=#d6d6d6
| 244161 ||  || — || December 9, 2001 || Socorro || LINEAR || URS || align=right | 6.3 km || 
|-id=162 bgcolor=#fefefe
| 244162 ||  || — || December 10, 2001 || Socorro || LINEAR || — || align=right | 1.3 km || 
|-id=163 bgcolor=#E9E9E9
| 244163 ||  || — || December 10, 2001 || Socorro || LINEAR || — || align=right | 1.7 km || 
|-id=164 bgcolor=#fefefe
| 244164 ||  || — || December 11, 2001 || Socorro || LINEAR || — || align=right | 1.6 km || 
|-id=165 bgcolor=#fefefe
| 244165 ||  || — || December 9, 2001 || Socorro || LINEAR || — || align=right | 1.3 km || 
|-id=166 bgcolor=#E9E9E9
| 244166 ||  || — || December 9, 2001 || Socorro || LINEAR || MIT || align=right | 5.8 km || 
|-id=167 bgcolor=#fefefe
| 244167 ||  || — || December 10, 2001 || Socorro || LINEAR || — || align=right | 1.2 km || 
|-id=168 bgcolor=#d6d6d6
| 244168 ||  || — || December 11, 2001 || Socorro || LINEAR || — || align=right | 3.9 km || 
|-id=169 bgcolor=#fefefe
| 244169 ||  || — || December 11, 2001 || Socorro || LINEAR || — || align=right | 1.5 km || 
|-id=170 bgcolor=#fefefe
| 244170 ||  || — || December 11, 2001 || Socorro || LINEAR || FLO || align=right | 1.1 km || 
|-id=171 bgcolor=#d6d6d6
| 244171 ||  || — || December 10, 2001 || Socorro || LINEAR || — || align=right | 4.8 km || 
|-id=172 bgcolor=#fefefe
| 244172 ||  || — || December 10, 2001 || Socorro || LINEAR || NYS || align=right data-sort-value="0.93" | 930 m || 
|-id=173 bgcolor=#d6d6d6
| 244173 ||  || — || December 10, 2001 || Socorro || LINEAR || — || align=right | 4.5 km || 
|-id=174 bgcolor=#fefefe
| 244174 ||  || — || December 14, 2001 || Socorro || LINEAR || — || align=right | 1.2 km || 
|-id=175 bgcolor=#fefefe
| 244175 ||  || — || December 14, 2001 || Socorro || LINEAR || NYS || align=right data-sort-value="0.66" | 660 m || 
|-id=176 bgcolor=#fefefe
| 244176 ||  || — || December 14, 2001 || Socorro || LINEAR || FLO || align=right data-sort-value="0.74" | 740 m || 
|-id=177 bgcolor=#E9E9E9
| 244177 ||  || — || December 14, 2001 || Socorro || LINEAR || HNA || align=right | 3.1 km || 
|-id=178 bgcolor=#fefefe
| 244178 ||  || — || December 14, 2001 || Socorro || LINEAR || NYS || align=right data-sort-value="0.93" | 930 m || 
|-id=179 bgcolor=#fefefe
| 244179 ||  || — || December 14, 2001 || Socorro || LINEAR || MAS || align=right | 1.0 km || 
|-id=180 bgcolor=#fefefe
| 244180 ||  || — || December 14, 2001 || Socorro || LINEAR || ERI || align=right | 2.3 km || 
|-id=181 bgcolor=#d6d6d6
| 244181 ||  || — || December 14, 2001 || Socorro || LINEAR || — || align=right | 6.7 km || 
|-id=182 bgcolor=#fefefe
| 244182 ||  || — || December 11, 2001 || Socorro || LINEAR || — || align=right data-sort-value="0.91" | 910 m || 
|-id=183 bgcolor=#d6d6d6
| 244183 ||  || — || December 11, 2001 || Socorro || LINEAR || LUT || align=right | 6.3 km || 
|-id=184 bgcolor=#d6d6d6
| 244184 ||  || — || December 11, 2001 || Socorro || LINEAR || — || align=right | 4.2 km || 
|-id=185 bgcolor=#d6d6d6
| 244185 ||  || — || December 11, 2001 || Socorro || LINEAR || — || align=right | 8.1 km || 
|-id=186 bgcolor=#fefefe
| 244186 ||  || — || December 14, 2001 || Socorro || LINEAR || — || align=right data-sort-value="0.96" | 960 m || 
|-id=187 bgcolor=#fefefe
| 244187 ||  || — || December 15, 2001 || Socorro || LINEAR || V || align=right data-sort-value="0.81" | 810 m || 
|-id=188 bgcolor=#E9E9E9
| 244188 ||  || — || December 15, 2001 || Socorro || LINEAR || HOF || align=right | 3.2 km || 
|-id=189 bgcolor=#fefefe
| 244189 ||  || — || December 15, 2001 || Socorro || LINEAR || — || align=right | 2.2 km || 
|-id=190 bgcolor=#E9E9E9
| 244190 ||  || — || December 15, 2001 || Apache Point || SDSS || — || align=right | 3.8 km || 
|-id=191 bgcolor=#d6d6d6
| 244191 ||  || — || December 17, 2001 || Socorro || LINEAR || — || align=right | 4.3 km || 
|-id=192 bgcolor=#fefefe
| 244192 ||  || — || December 18, 2001 || Socorro || LINEAR || — || align=right | 1.2 km || 
|-id=193 bgcolor=#fefefe
| 244193 ||  || — || December 18, 2001 || Socorro || LINEAR || — || align=right | 1.3 km || 
|-id=194 bgcolor=#d6d6d6
| 244194 ||  || — || December 18, 2001 || Socorro || LINEAR || — || align=right | 4.8 km || 
|-id=195 bgcolor=#d6d6d6
| 244195 ||  || — || December 18, 2001 || Socorro || LINEAR || — || align=right | 4.8 km || 
|-id=196 bgcolor=#fefefe
| 244196 ||  || — || December 18, 2001 || Socorro || LINEAR || — || align=right | 1.3 km || 
|-id=197 bgcolor=#d6d6d6
| 244197 ||  || — || December 18, 2001 || Socorro || LINEAR || — || align=right | 4.2 km || 
|-id=198 bgcolor=#fefefe
| 244198 ||  || — || December 18, 2001 || Socorro || LINEAR || FLO || align=right | 1.1 km || 
|-id=199 bgcolor=#fefefe
| 244199 ||  || — || December 18, 2001 || Socorro || LINEAR || — || align=right | 2.4 km || 
|-id=200 bgcolor=#d6d6d6
| 244200 ||  || — || December 17, 2001 || Socorro || LINEAR || 7:4 || align=right | 4.8 km || 
|}

244201–244300 

|-bgcolor=#fefefe
| 244201 ||  || — || December 17, 2001 || Socorro || LINEAR || — || align=right | 1.2 km || 
|-id=202 bgcolor=#fefefe
| 244202 ||  || — || December 18, 2001 || Kitt Peak || Spacewatch || ERI || align=right | 2.1 km || 
|-id=203 bgcolor=#E9E9E9
| 244203 ||  || — || December 17, 2001 || Socorro || LINEAR || — || align=right | 2.1 km || 
|-id=204 bgcolor=#fefefe
| 244204 ||  || — || December 17, 2001 || Kitt Peak || Spacewatch || — || align=right | 1.2 km || 
|-id=205 bgcolor=#fefefe
| 244205 ||  || — || December 17, 2001 || Socorro || LINEAR || V || align=right data-sort-value="0.97" | 970 m || 
|-id=206 bgcolor=#E9E9E9
| 244206 ||  || — || December 18, 2001 || Apache Point || SDSS || MIT || align=right | 2.2 km || 
|-id=207 bgcolor=#fefefe
| 244207 ||  || — || January 6, 2002 || Kitt Peak || Spacewatch || KLI || align=right | 3.0 km || 
|-id=208 bgcolor=#fefefe
| 244208 ||  || — || January 6, 2002 || Kitt Peak || Spacewatch || NYS || align=right data-sort-value="0.62" | 620 m || 
|-id=209 bgcolor=#E9E9E9
| 244209 ||  || — || January 7, 2002 || Socorro || LINEAR || EUN || align=right | 1.7 km || 
|-id=210 bgcolor=#fefefe
| 244210 ||  || — || January 5, 2002 || Palomar || NEAT || ERI || align=right | 1.8 km || 
|-id=211 bgcolor=#fefefe
| 244211 ||  || — || January 8, 2002 || Palomar || NEAT || — || align=right | 1.3 km || 
|-id=212 bgcolor=#fefefe
| 244212 ||  || — || January 9, 2002 || Socorro || LINEAR || NYS || align=right data-sort-value="0.88" | 880 m || 
|-id=213 bgcolor=#fefefe
| 244213 ||  || — || January 9, 2002 || Socorro || LINEAR || — || align=right | 1.4 km || 
|-id=214 bgcolor=#fefefe
| 244214 ||  || — || January 9, 2002 || Socorro || LINEAR || ERI || align=right | 2.0 km || 
|-id=215 bgcolor=#fefefe
| 244215 ||  || — || January 9, 2002 || Socorro || LINEAR || FLO || align=right | 1.6 km || 
|-id=216 bgcolor=#fefefe
| 244216 ||  || — || January 8, 2002 || Socorro || LINEAR || — || align=right data-sort-value="0.85" | 850 m || 
|-id=217 bgcolor=#fefefe
| 244217 ||  || — || January 8, 2002 || Socorro || LINEAR || NYS || align=right data-sort-value="0.79" | 790 m || 
|-id=218 bgcolor=#fefefe
| 244218 ||  || — || January 14, 2002 || Cerro Tololo || DLS || KLI || align=right | 1.4 km || 
|-id=219 bgcolor=#fefefe
| 244219 ||  || — || January 9, 2002 || Socorro || LINEAR || FLO || align=right | 1.1 km || 
|-id=220 bgcolor=#fefefe
| 244220 ||  || — || January 13, 2002 || Socorro || LINEAR || PHO || align=right | 2.7 km || 
|-id=221 bgcolor=#fefefe
| 244221 ||  || — || January 13, 2002 || Socorro || LINEAR || — || align=right | 1.0 km || 
|-id=222 bgcolor=#fefefe
| 244222 ||  || — || January 13, 2002 || Socorro || LINEAR || V || align=right | 1.2 km || 
|-id=223 bgcolor=#d6d6d6
| 244223 ||  || — || January 14, 2002 || Socorro || LINEAR || EUP || align=right | 5.7 km || 
|-id=224 bgcolor=#fefefe
| 244224 ||  || — || January 14, 2002 || Socorro || LINEAR || V || align=right data-sort-value="0.95" | 950 m || 
|-id=225 bgcolor=#fefefe
| 244225 ||  || — || January 19, 2002 || Desert Eagle || W. K. Y. Yeung || — || align=right | 1.3 km || 
|-id=226 bgcolor=#E9E9E9
| 244226 ||  || — || January 18, 2002 || Anderson Mesa || LONEOS || — || align=right | 1.7 km || 
|-id=227 bgcolor=#d6d6d6
| 244227 ||  || — || January 21, 2002 || Socorro || LINEAR || TRP || align=right | 4.8 km || 
|-id=228 bgcolor=#fefefe
| 244228 ||  || — || January 21, 2002 || Socorro || LINEAR || V || align=right | 1.0 km || 
|-id=229 bgcolor=#d6d6d6
| 244229 ||  || — || February 9, 2002 || Desert Eagle || W. K. Y. Yeung || — || align=right | 4.5 km || 
|-id=230 bgcolor=#fefefe
| 244230 ||  || — || February 4, 2002 || Haleakala || NEAT || V || align=right data-sort-value="0.96" | 960 m || 
|-id=231 bgcolor=#fefefe
| 244231 ||  || — || February 3, 2002 || Haleakala || NEAT || NYS || align=right data-sort-value="0.91" | 910 m || 
|-id=232 bgcolor=#fefefe
| 244232 ||  || — || February 6, 2002 || Socorro || LINEAR || V || align=right | 1.1 km || 
|-id=233 bgcolor=#fefefe
| 244233 ||  || — || February 7, 2002 || Socorro || LINEAR || — || align=right data-sort-value="0.96" | 960 m || 
|-id=234 bgcolor=#E9E9E9
| 244234 ||  || — || February 7, 2002 || Socorro || LINEAR || — || align=right | 6.3 km || 
|-id=235 bgcolor=#fefefe
| 244235 ||  || — || February 7, 2002 || Socorro || LINEAR || V || align=right data-sort-value="0.98" | 980 m || 
|-id=236 bgcolor=#fefefe
| 244236 ||  || — || February 7, 2002 || Socorro || LINEAR || — || align=right | 1.3 km || 
|-id=237 bgcolor=#fefefe
| 244237 ||  || — || February 7, 2002 || Socorro || LINEAR || CLA || align=right | 2.6 km || 
|-id=238 bgcolor=#fefefe
| 244238 ||  || — || February 7, 2002 || Socorro || LINEAR || NYS || align=right data-sort-value="0.77" | 770 m || 
|-id=239 bgcolor=#fefefe
| 244239 ||  || — || February 7, 2002 || Socorro || LINEAR || V || align=right | 1.1 km || 
|-id=240 bgcolor=#d6d6d6
| 244240 ||  || — || February 7, 2002 || Socorro || LINEAR || — || align=right | 4.0 km || 
|-id=241 bgcolor=#fefefe
| 244241 ||  || — || February 7, 2002 || Socorro || LINEAR || — || align=right | 1.3 km || 
|-id=242 bgcolor=#fefefe
| 244242 ||  || — || February 8, 2002 || Socorro || LINEAR || NYS || align=right | 1.00 km || 
|-id=243 bgcolor=#fefefe
| 244243 ||  || — || February 14, 2002 || Needville || Needville Obs. || — || align=right | 1.2 km || 
|-id=244 bgcolor=#fefefe
| 244244 ||  || — || February 7, 2002 || Socorro || LINEAR || SUL || align=right | 3.6 km || 
|-id=245 bgcolor=#fefefe
| 244245 ||  || — || February 7, 2002 || Socorro || LINEAR || — || align=right | 1.3 km || 
|-id=246 bgcolor=#fefefe
| 244246 ||  || — || February 7, 2002 || Socorro || LINEAR || — || align=right | 1.0 km || 
|-id=247 bgcolor=#fefefe
| 244247 ||  || — || February 7, 2002 || Socorro || LINEAR || V || align=right | 1.1 km || 
|-id=248 bgcolor=#fefefe
| 244248 ||  || — || February 9, 2002 || Socorro || LINEAR || NYS || align=right data-sort-value="0.92" | 920 m || 
|-id=249 bgcolor=#d6d6d6
| 244249 ||  || — || February 8, 2002 || Kitt Peak || Spacewatch || — || align=right | 3.3 km || 
|-id=250 bgcolor=#d6d6d6
| 244250 ||  || — || February 8, 2002 || Socorro || LINEAR || — || align=right | 5.5 km || 
|-id=251 bgcolor=#d6d6d6
| 244251 ||  || — || February 8, 2002 || Socorro || LINEAR || EOS || align=right | 4.0 km || 
|-id=252 bgcolor=#fefefe
| 244252 ||  || — || February 8, 2002 || Socorro || LINEAR || — || align=right | 1.2 km || 
|-id=253 bgcolor=#d6d6d6
| 244253 ||  || — || February 10, 2002 || Socorro || LINEAR || — || align=right | 4.8 km || 
|-id=254 bgcolor=#fefefe
| 244254 ||  || — || February 10, 2002 || Socorro || LINEAR || MAS || align=right data-sort-value="0.95" | 950 m || 
|-id=255 bgcolor=#fefefe
| 244255 ||  || — || February 10, 2002 || Socorro || LINEAR || MAS || align=right data-sort-value="0.84" | 840 m || 
|-id=256 bgcolor=#fefefe
| 244256 ||  || — || February 10, 2002 || Socorro || LINEAR || — || align=right | 1.9 km || 
|-id=257 bgcolor=#fefefe
| 244257 ||  || — || February 11, 2002 || Socorro || LINEAR || — || align=right data-sort-value="0.80" | 800 m || 
|-id=258 bgcolor=#d6d6d6
| 244258 ||  || — || February 3, 2002 || Haleakala || NEAT || — || align=right | 4.0 km || 
|-id=259 bgcolor=#fefefe
| 244259 ||  || — || February 11, 2002 || Socorro || LINEAR || NYS || align=right data-sort-value="0.92" | 920 m || 
|-id=260 bgcolor=#d6d6d6
| 244260 ||  || — || February 13, 2002 || Socorro || LINEAR || EUP || align=right | 4.8 km || 
|-id=261 bgcolor=#d6d6d6
| 244261 ||  || — || February 3, 2002 || Haleakala || NEAT || 627 || align=right | 3.6 km || 
|-id=262 bgcolor=#fefefe
| 244262 ||  || — || February 3, 2002 || Haleakala || NEAT || CIM || align=right | 3.0 km || 
|-id=263 bgcolor=#d6d6d6
| 244263 ||  || — || February 8, 2002 || Kitt Peak || M. W. Buie || — || align=right | 2.4 km || 
|-id=264 bgcolor=#fefefe
| 244264 ||  || — || February 8, 2002 || Kitt Peak || Spacewatch || NYS || align=right data-sort-value="0.78" | 780 m || 
|-id=265 bgcolor=#fefefe
| 244265 ||  || — || February 13, 2002 || Kitt Peak || Spacewatch || V || align=right data-sort-value="0.82" | 820 m || 
|-id=266 bgcolor=#fefefe
| 244266 ||  || — || February 3, 2002 || Anderson Mesa || LONEOS || NYS || align=right | 2.2 km || 
|-id=267 bgcolor=#fefefe
| 244267 ||  || — || February 5, 2002 || Anderson Mesa || LONEOS || NYS || align=right data-sort-value="0.83" | 830 m || 
|-id=268 bgcolor=#fefefe
| 244268 ||  || — || February 7, 2002 || Palomar || NEAT || V || align=right data-sort-value="0.99" | 990 m || 
|-id=269 bgcolor=#d6d6d6
| 244269 || 2002 DN || — || February 16, 2002 || Bohyunsan || Y.-B. Jeon, B.-C. Lee || — || align=right | 4.1 km || 
|-id=270 bgcolor=#d6d6d6
| 244270 ||  || — || February 18, 2002 || Cima Ekar || ADAS || — || align=right | 7.2 km || 
|-id=271 bgcolor=#fefefe
| 244271 ||  || — || February 22, 2002 || Palomar || NEAT || — || align=right data-sort-value="0.83" | 830 m || 
|-id=272 bgcolor=#fefefe
| 244272 ||  || — || February 16, 2002 || Palomar || NEAT || — || align=right | 1.4 km || 
|-id=273 bgcolor=#fefefe
| 244273 ||  || — || March 11, 2002 || Palomar || NEAT || H || align=right data-sort-value="0.97" | 970 m || 
|-id=274 bgcolor=#fefefe
| 244274 ||  || — || March 6, 2002 || Siding Spring || R. H. McNaught || NYS || align=right | 1.8 km || 
|-id=275 bgcolor=#E9E9E9
| 244275 ||  || — || March 12, 2002 || Kvistaberg || UDAS || — || align=right | 1.6 km || 
|-id=276 bgcolor=#fefefe
| 244276 ||  || — || March 6, 2002 || Palomar || NEAT || — || align=right | 2.7 km || 
|-id=277 bgcolor=#fefefe
| 244277 ||  || — || March 9, 2002 || Palomar || NEAT || — || align=right data-sort-value="0.94" | 940 m || 
|-id=278 bgcolor=#E9E9E9
| 244278 ||  || — || March 10, 2002 || Anderson Mesa || LONEOS || MIT || align=right | 3.6 km || 
|-id=279 bgcolor=#fefefe
| 244279 ||  || — || March 9, 2002 || Socorro || LINEAR || NYS || align=right | 2.9 km || 
|-id=280 bgcolor=#fefefe
| 244280 ||  || — || March 9, 2002 || Socorro || LINEAR || — || align=right | 1.2 km || 
|-id=281 bgcolor=#d6d6d6
| 244281 ||  || — || March 9, 2002 || Socorro || LINEAR || THM || align=right | 4.6 km || 
|-id=282 bgcolor=#d6d6d6
| 244282 ||  || — || March 13, 2002 || Socorro || LINEAR || — || align=right | 6.0 km || 
|-id=283 bgcolor=#fefefe
| 244283 ||  || — || March 9, 2002 || Socorro || LINEAR || MAS || align=right | 1.2 km || 
|-id=284 bgcolor=#fefefe
| 244284 ||  || — || March 14, 2002 || Socorro || LINEAR || NYS || align=right data-sort-value="0.88" | 880 m || 
|-id=285 bgcolor=#fefefe
| 244285 ||  || — || March 14, 2002 || Socorro || LINEAR || MAS || align=right | 1.0 km || 
|-id=286 bgcolor=#fefefe
| 244286 ||  || — || March 6, 2002 || Socorro || LINEAR || — || align=right | 1.2 km || 
|-id=287 bgcolor=#E9E9E9
| 244287 ||  || — || March 9, 2002 || Anderson Mesa || LONEOS || — || align=right | 3.4 km || 
|-id=288 bgcolor=#fefefe
| 244288 ||  || — || March 9, 2002 || Palomar || NEAT || NYS || align=right | 1.6 km || 
|-id=289 bgcolor=#fefefe
| 244289 ||  || — || March 10, 2002 || Anderson Mesa || LONEOS || — || align=right | 1.5 km || 
|-id=290 bgcolor=#d6d6d6
| 244290 ||  || — || March 10, 2002 || Kitt Peak || Spacewatch || — || align=right | 5.2 km || 
|-id=291 bgcolor=#fefefe
| 244291 ||  || — || March 12, 2002 || Palomar || NEAT || NYS || align=right data-sort-value="0.90" | 900 m || 
|-id=292 bgcolor=#E9E9E9
| 244292 ||  || — || March 12, 2002 || Palomar || NEAT || PAD || align=right | 2.2 km || 
|-id=293 bgcolor=#fefefe
| 244293 ||  || — || March 13, 2002 || Palomar || NEAT || NYS || align=right data-sort-value="0.81" | 810 m || 
|-id=294 bgcolor=#d6d6d6
| 244294 ||  || — || March 15, 2002 || Palomar || NEAT || EOS || align=right | 3.8 km || 
|-id=295 bgcolor=#E9E9E9
| 244295 ||  || — || March 15, 2002 || Socorro || LINEAR || MAR || align=right | 1.3 km || 
|-id=296 bgcolor=#fefefe
| 244296 ||  || — || March 6, 2002 || Palomar || NEAT || — || align=right | 2.3 km || 
|-id=297 bgcolor=#fefefe
| 244297 ||  || — || March 20, 2002 || Desert Eagle || W. K. Y. Yeung || FLO || align=right | 1.1 km || 
|-id=298 bgcolor=#E9E9E9
| 244298 ||  || — || March 22, 2002 || Eskridge || Farpoint Obs. || — || align=right | 1.6 km || 
|-id=299 bgcolor=#fefefe
| 244299 ||  || — || March 19, 2002 || Palomar || NEAT || — || align=right | 2.8 km || 
|-id=300 bgcolor=#E9E9E9
| 244300 ||  || — || March 19, 2002 || Palomar || NEAT || — || align=right | 1.8 km || 
|}

244301–244400 

|-bgcolor=#fefefe
| 244301 ||  || — || March 21, 2002 || Anderson Mesa || LONEOS || — || align=right | 1.7 km || 
|-id=302 bgcolor=#fefefe
| 244302 ||  || — || April 9, 2002 || Socorro || LINEAR || H || align=right data-sort-value="0.68" | 680 m || 
|-id=303 bgcolor=#E9E9E9
| 244303 ||  || — || April 9, 2002 || Palomar || NEAT || MIT || align=right | 3.5 km || 
|-id=304 bgcolor=#E9E9E9
| 244304 ||  || — || April 8, 2002 || Palomar || NEAT || — || align=right | 2.5 km || 
|-id=305 bgcolor=#fefefe
| 244305 ||  || — || April 10, 2002 || Palomar || NEAT || — || align=right | 2.1 km || 
|-id=306 bgcolor=#E9E9E9
| 244306 ||  || — || April 10, 2002 || Socorro || LINEAR || CLO || align=right | 4.0 km || 
|-id=307 bgcolor=#d6d6d6
| 244307 ||  || — || April 8, 2002 || Kitt Peak || Spacewatch || — || align=right | 4.5 km || 
|-id=308 bgcolor=#E9E9E9
| 244308 ||  || — || April 9, 2002 || Kitt Peak || Spacewatch || — || align=right data-sort-value="0.89" | 890 m || 
|-id=309 bgcolor=#E9E9E9
| 244309 ||  || — || April 9, 2002 || Socorro || LINEAR || — || align=right | 3.6 km || 
|-id=310 bgcolor=#fefefe
| 244310 ||  || — || April 11, 2002 || Anderson Mesa || LONEOS || — || align=right | 1.1 km || 
|-id=311 bgcolor=#E9E9E9
| 244311 ||  || — || April 11, 2002 || Socorro || LINEAR || — || align=right | 4.8 km || 
|-id=312 bgcolor=#E9E9E9
| 244312 ||  || — || April 12, 2002 || Socorro || LINEAR || — || align=right | 1.1 km || 
|-id=313 bgcolor=#fefefe
| 244313 ||  || — || April 12, 2002 || Socorro || LINEAR || — || align=right | 1.3 km || 
|-id=314 bgcolor=#d6d6d6
| 244314 ||  || — || April 12, 2002 || Socorro || LINEAR || — || align=right | 7.6 km || 
|-id=315 bgcolor=#fefefe
| 244315 ||  || — || April 13, 2002 || Palomar || NEAT || H || align=right | 1.0 km || 
|-id=316 bgcolor=#E9E9E9
| 244316 ||  || — || April 12, 2002 || Palomar || NEAT || — || align=right | 1.8 km || 
|-id=317 bgcolor=#d6d6d6
| 244317 ||  || — || April 14, 2002 || Socorro || LINEAR || URS || align=right | 5.2 km || 
|-id=318 bgcolor=#E9E9E9
| 244318 ||  || — || April 15, 2002 || Palomar || NEAT || BRU || align=right | 4.3 km || 
|-id=319 bgcolor=#E9E9E9
| 244319 ||  || — || April 10, 2002 || Socorro || LINEAR || — || align=right | 1.8 km || 
|-id=320 bgcolor=#fefefe
| 244320 ||  || — || April 7, 2002 || Cerro Tololo || M. W. Buie || MAS || align=right data-sort-value="0.78" | 780 m || 
|-id=321 bgcolor=#fefefe
| 244321 ||  || — || April 5, 2002 || Kitt Peak || Spacewatch || — || align=right data-sort-value="0.97" | 970 m || 
|-id=322 bgcolor=#fefefe
| 244322 ||  || — || April 9, 2002 || Palomar || NEAT || NYS || align=right | 2.2 km || 
|-id=323 bgcolor=#d6d6d6
| 244323 ||  || — || April 22, 2002 || Palomar || NEAT || EUP || align=right | 6.4 km || 
|-id=324 bgcolor=#fefefe
| 244324 ||  || — || April 21, 2002 || Socorro || LINEAR || H || align=right data-sort-value="0.80" | 800 m || 
|-id=325 bgcolor=#fefefe
| 244325 ||  || — || April 17, 2002 || Socorro || LINEAR || MAS || align=right | 1.0 km || 
|-id=326 bgcolor=#E9E9E9
| 244326 ||  || — || April 18, 2002 || Socorro || LINEAR || — || align=right | 1.8 km || 
|-id=327 bgcolor=#fefefe
| 244327 ||  || — || April 19, 2002 || Kitt Peak || Spacewatch || — || align=right | 2.9 km || 
|-id=328 bgcolor=#E9E9E9
| 244328 ||  || — || May 5, 2002 || Prescott || P. G. Comba || — || align=right | 1.7 km || 
|-id=329 bgcolor=#fefefe
| 244329 ||  || — || May 6, 2002 || Socorro || LINEAR || H || align=right data-sort-value="0.76" | 760 m || 
|-id=330 bgcolor=#fefefe
| 244330 ||  || — || May 6, 2002 || Anderson Mesa || LONEOS || — || align=right | 2.6 km || 
|-id=331 bgcolor=#E9E9E9
| 244331 ||  || — || May 9, 2002 || Desert Eagle || W. K. Y. Yeung || — || align=right | 3.1 km || 
|-id=332 bgcolor=#E9E9E9
| 244332 ||  || — || May 9, 2002 || Socorro || LINEAR || — || align=right | 2.8 km || 
|-id=333 bgcolor=#fefefe
| 244333 ||  || — || May 9, 2002 || Socorro || LINEAR || ERI || align=right | 2.3 km || 
|-id=334 bgcolor=#d6d6d6
| 244334 ||  || — || May 9, 2002 || Socorro || LINEAR || LUT || align=right | 5.4 km || 
|-id=335 bgcolor=#fefefe
| 244335 ||  || — || May 8, 2002 || Socorro || LINEAR || — || align=right | 1.4 km || 
|-id=336 bgcolor=#d6d6d6
| 244336 ||  || — || May 11, 2002 || Socorro || LINEAR || — || align=right | 5.1 km || 
|-id=337 bgcolor=#fefefe
| 244337 ||  || — || May 11, 2002 || Socorro || LINEAR || LCI || align=right | 1.3 km || 
|-id=338 bgcolor=#E9E9E9
| 244338 ||  || — || May 11, 2002 || Socorro || LINEAR || — || align=right | 2.0 km || 
|-id=339 bgcolor=#fefefe
| 244339 ||  || — || May 10, 2002 || Socorro || LINEAR || NYS || align=right data-sort-value="0.95" | 950 m || 
|-id=340 bgcolor=#E9E9E9
| 244340 ||  || — || May 14, 2002 || Palomar || NEAT || BAR || align=right | 2.4 km || 
|-id=341 bgcolor=#fefefe
| 244341 ||  || — || May 11, 2002 || Socorro || LINEAR || — || align=right | 1.2 km || 
|-id=342 bgcolor=#fefefe
| 244342 ||  || — || May 6, 2002 || Socorro || LINEAR || PHO || align=right | 2.1 km || 
|-id=343 bgcolor=#E9E9E9
| 244343 ||  || — || May 5, 2002 || Palomar || NEAT || — || align=right | 2.0 km || 
|-id=344 bgcolor=#E9E9E9
| 244344 ||  || — || May 18, 2002 || Palomar || NEAT || — || align=right | 2.2 km || 
|-id=345 bgcolor=#E9E9E9
| 244345 ||  || — || May 16, 2002 || Palomar || NEAT || RAF || align=right | 1.4 km || 
|-id=346 bgcolor=#E9E9E9
| 244346 ||  || — || June 2, 2002 || Palomar || NEAT || MIT || align=right | 2.8 km || 
|-id=347 bgcolor=#fefefe
| 244347 ||  || — || June 3, 2002 || Socorro || LINEAR || H || align=right | 1.0 km || 
|-id=348 bgcolor=#E9E9E9
| 244348 ||  || — || June 7, 2002 || Socorro || LINEAR || — || align=right | 4.0 km || 
|-id=349 bgcolor=#fefefe
| 244349 ||  || — || June 8, 2002 || Kitt Peak || Spacewatch || — || align=right | 1.9 km || 
|-id=350 bgcolor=#E9E9E9
| 244350 ||  || — || June 10, 2002 || Socorro || LINEAR || — || align=right | 1.4 km || 
|-id=351 bgcolor=#E9E9E9
| 244351 ||  || — || June 10, 2002 || Socorro || LINEAR || MIT || align=right | 4.2 km || 
|-id=352 bgcolor=#E9E9E9
| 244352 ||  || — || June 8, 2002 || Socorro || LINEAR || — || align=right | 3.8 km || 
|-id=353 bgcolor=#fefefe
| 244353 ||  || — || June 2, 2002 || Palomar || NEAT || V || align=right data-sort-value="0.85" | 850 m || 
|-id=354 bgcolor=#E9E9E9
| 244354 ||  || — || June 13, 2002 || Palomar || NEAT || MAR || align=right | 1.7 km || 
|-id=355 bgcolor=#E9E9E9
| 244355 || 2002 MH || — || June 17, 2002 || Campo Imperatore || CINEOS || — || align=right | 1.2 km || 
|-id=356 bgcolor=#E9E9E9
| 244356 ||  || — || July 9, 2002 || Palomar || NEAT || — || align=right | 2.9 km || 
|-id=357 bgcolor=#E9E9E9
| 244357 ||  || — || July 9, 2002 || Palomar || NEAT || — || align=right | 3.7 km || 
|-id=358 bgcolor=#E9E9E9
| 244358 ||  || — || July 5, 2002 || Socorro || LINEAR || — || align=right | 1.6 km || 
|-id=359 bgcolor=#E9E9E9
| 244359 ||  || — || July 9, 2002 || Socorro || LINEAR || RAF || align=right | 1.6 km || 
|-id=360 bgcolor=#d6d6d6
| 244360 ||  || — || July 9, 2002 || Socorro || LINEAR || EUP || align=right | 6.4 km || 
|-id=361 bgcolor=#E9E9E9
| 244361 ||  || — || July 13, 2002 || Socorro || LINEAR || — || align=right | 3.8 km || 
|-id=362 bgcolor=#d6d6d6
| 244362 ||  || — || July 9, 2002 || Campo Imperatore || CINEOS || — || align=right | 5.2 km || 
|-id=363 bgcolor=#d6d6d6
| 244363 ||  || — || July 12, 2002 || Palomar || NEAT || — || align=right | 4.8 km || 
|-id=364 bgcolor=#E9E9E9
| 244364 ||  || — || July 13, 2002 || Haleakala || NEAT || — || align=right | 1.6 km || 
|-id=365 bgcolor=#E9E9E9
| 244365 ||  || — || July 14, 2002 || Palomar || NEAT || — || align=right | 2.2 km || 
|-id=366 bgcolor=#E9E9E9
| 244366 ||  || — || July 12, 2002 || Palomar || NEAT || JUN || align=right | 1.8 km || 
|-id=367 bgcolor=#E9E9E9
| 244367 ||  || — || July 3, 2002 || Palomar || NEAT || — || align=right | 1.4 km || 
|-id=368 bgcolor=#E9E9E9
| 244368 ||  || — || July 9, 2002 || Socorro || LINEAR || — || align=right | 2.6 km || 
|-id=369 bgcolor=#E9E9E9
| 244369 ||  || — || July 9, 2002 || Palomar || NEAT || — || align=right | 3.9 km || 
|-id=370 bgcolor=#E9E9E9
| 244370 ||  || — || July 18, 2002 || Socorro || LINEAR || — || align=right | 3.1 km || 
|-id=371 bgcolor=#E9E9E9
| 244371 ||  || — || July 18, 2002 || Socorro || LINEAR || EUN || align=right | 1.9 km || 
|-id=372 bgcolor=#d6d6d6
| 244372 ||  || — || July 27, 2002 || Palomar || NEAT || — || align=right | 5.9 km || 
|-id=373 bgcolor=#E9E9E9
| 244373 ||  || — || July 30, 2002 || Haleakala || NEAT || — || align=right | 2.7 km || 
|-id=374 bgcolor=#E9E9E9
| 244374 ||  || — || July 17, 2002 || Palomar || NEAT || — || align=right | 1.7 km || 
|-id=375 bgcolor=#d6d6d6
| 244375 ||  || — || July 18, 2002 || Palomar || NEAT || — || align=right | 4.5 km || 
|-id=376 bgcolor=#E9E9E9
| 244376 ||  || — || August 4, 2002 || Palomar || NEAT || — || align=right | 3.2 km || 
|-id=377 bgcolor=#E9E9E9
| 244377 ||  || — || August 6, 2002 || Palomar || NEAT || — || align=right | 3.1 km || 
|-id=378 bgcolor=#E9E9E9
| 244378 ||  || — || August 5, 2002 || Palomar || NEAT || — || align=right | 1.8 km || 
|-id=379 bgcolor=#E9E9E9
| 244379 ||  || — || August 5, 2002 || Campo Imperatore || CINEOS || — || align=right | 3.1 km || 
|-id=380 bgcolor=#fefefe
| 244380 ||  || — || August 6, 2002 || Palomar || NEAT || — || align=right | 1.8 km || 
|-id=381 bgcolor=#E9E9E9
| 244381 ||  || — || August 6, 2002 || Palomar || NEAT || — || align=right | 2.3 km || 
|-id=382 bgcolor=#E9E9E9
| 244382 ||  || — || August 6, 2002 || Palomar || NEAT || — || align=right | 3.4 km || 
|-id=383 bgcolor=#E9E9E9
| 244383 ||  || — || August 6, 2002 || Palomar || NEAT || — || align=right | 3.4 km || 
|-id=384 bgcolor=#fefefe
| 244384 ||  || — || August 6, 2002 || Palomar || NEAT || NYS || align=right | 1.6 km || 
|-id=385 bgcolor=#d6d6d6
| 244385 ||  || — || August 6, 2002 || Palomar || NEAT || — || align=right | 5.1 km || 
|-id=386 bgcolor=#E9E9E9
| 244386 ||  || — || August 6, 2002 || Palomar || NEAT || ADE || align=right | 3.5 km || 
|-id=387 bgcolor=#E9E9E9
| 244387 ||  || — || August 6, 2002 || Palomar || NEAT || — || align=right | 3.8 km || 
|-id=388 bgcolor=#E9E9E9
| 244388 ||  || — || August 3, 2002 || Palomar || NEAT || — || align=right | 3.8 km || 
|-id=389 bgcolor=#E9E9E9
| 244389 ||  || — || August 11, 2002 || Palomar || NEAT || INO || align=right | 1.8 km || 
|-id=390 bgcolor=#E9E9E9
| 244390 ||  || — || August 11, 2002 || Socorro || LINEAR || MIT || align=right | 2.0 km || 
|-id=391 bgcolor=#E9E9E9
| 244391 ||  || — || August 12, 2002 || Socorro || LINEAR || — || align=right | 2.7 km || 
|-id=392 bgcolor=#E9E9E9
| 244392 ||  || — || August 11, 2002 || Socorro || LINEAR || — || align=right | 3.7 km || 
|-id=393 bgcolor=#E9E9E9
| 244393 ||  || — || August 12, 2002 || Anderson Mesa || LONEOS || — || align=right | 1.8 km || 
|-id=394 bgcolor=#E9E9E9
| 244394 ||  || — || August 14, 2002 || Socorro || LINEAR || — || align=right | 3.9 km || 
|-id=395 bgcolor=#E9E9E9
| 244395 ||  || — || August 13, 2002 || Anderson Mesa || LONEOS || — || align=right | 2.2 km || 
|-id=396 bgcolor=#E9E9E9
| 244396 ||  || — || August 14, 2002 || Socorro || LINEAR || — || align=right | 3.1 km || 
|-id=397 bgcolor=#d6d6d6
| 244397 ||  || — || August 15, 2002 || Kitt Peak || Spacewatch || SHU3:2 || align=right | 6.1 km || 
|-id=398 bgcolor=#E9E9E9
| 244398 ||  || — || August 14, 2002 || Palomar || NEAT || INO || align=right | 1.5 km || 
|-id=399 bgcolor=#E9E9E9
| 244399 ||  || — || August 13, 2002 || Palomar || NEAT || — || align=right | 1.8 km || 
|-id=400 bgcolor=#E9E9E9
| 244400 ||  || — || August 13, 2002 || Anderson Mesa || LONEOS || — || align=right | 1.5 km || 
|}

244401–244500 

|-bgcolor=#E9E9E9
| 244401 ||  || — || August 15, 2002 || Palomar || NEAT || — || align=right | 3.3 km || 
|-id=402 bgcolor=#E9E9E9
| 244402 ||  || — || August 13, 2002 || Anderson Mesa || LONEOS || INO || align=right | 1.6 km || 
|-id=403 bgcolor=#E9E9E9
| 244403 ||  || — || August 14, 2002 || Socorro || LINEAR || — || align=right | 1.6 km || 
|-id=404 bgcolor=#E9E9E9
| 244404 ||  || — || August 14, 2002 || Palomar || NEAT || — || align=right | 1.8 km || 
|-id=405 bgcolor=#E9E9E9
| 244405 ||  || — || August 15, 2002 || Anderson Mesa || LONEOS || MRX || align=right | 1.6 km || 
|-id=406 bgcolor=#E9E9E9
| 244406 ||  || — || August 14, 2002 || Socorro || LINEAR || — || align=right | 1.4 km || 
|-id=407 bgcolor=#E9E9E9
| 244407 ||  || — || August 4, 2002 || Socorro || LINEAR || MIT || align=right | 3.0 km || 
|-id=408 bgcolor=#E9E9E9
| 244408 ||  || — || August 15, 2002 || Palomar || NEAT || — || align=right | 2.5 km || 
|-id=409 bgcolor=#E9E9E9
| 244409 ||  || — || August 14, 2002 || Palomar || NEAT || — || align=right | 2.5 km || 
|-id=410 bgcolor=#E9E9E9
| 244410 ||  || — || August 15, 2002 || Palomar || NEAT || NEM || align=right | 3.6 km || 
|-id=411 bgcolor=#E9E9E9
| 244411 ||  || — || August 15, 2002 || Palomar || NEAT || — || align=right | 3.1 km || 
|-id=412 bgcolor=#E9E9E9
| 244412 ||  || — || August 15, 2002 || Palomar || NEAT || — || align=right | 1.7 km || 
|-id=413 bgcolor=#E9E9E9
| 244413 ||  || — || August 11, 2002 || Palomar || NEAT || — || align=right | 2.9 km || 
|-id=414 bgcolor=#E9E9E9
| 244414 ||  || — || August 7, 2002 || Palomar || NEAT || — || align=right | 1.3 km || 
|-id=415 bgcolor=#E9E9E9
| 244415 ||  || — || August 14, 2002 || Palomar || NEAT || — || align=right | 2.7 km || 
|-id=416 bgcolor=#E9E9E9
| 244416 ||  || — || August 16, 2002 || Socorro || LINEAR || — || align=right | 1.5 km || 
|-id=417 bgcolor=#d6d6d6
| 244417 ||  || — || August 16, 2002 || Palomar || NEAT || — || align=right | 5.7 km || 
|-id=418 bgcolor=#fefefe
| 244418 ||  || — || August 18, 2002 || Cottage Grove || Tenagra Obs. || H || align=right | 1.4 km || 
|-id=419 bgcolor=#E9E9E9
| 244419 ||  || — || August 26, 2002 || Palomar || NEAT || — || align=right | 1.3 km || 
|-id=420 bgcolor=#E9E9E9
| 244420 ||  || — || August 26, 2002 || Palomar || NEAT || PAD || align=right | 3.9 km || 
|-id=421 bgcolor=#E9E9E9
| 244421 ||  || — || August 31, 2002 || Anderson Mesa || LONEOS || — || align=right | 4.5 km || 
|-id=422 bgcolor=#E9E9E9
| 244422 ||  || — || August 18, 2002 || Palomar || S. F. Hönig || — || align=right | 2.2 km || 
|-id=423 bgcolor=#E9E9E9
| 244423 ||  || — || August 29, 2002 || Palomar || S. F. Hönig || WIT || align=right | 1.3 km || 
|-id=424 bgcolor=#E9E9E9
| 244424 ||  || — || August 28, 2002 || Palomar || NEAT || WIT || align=right | 1.5 km || 
|-id=425 bgcolor=#E9E9E9
| 244425 ||  || — || August 28, 2002 || Palomar || NEAT || — || align=right | 2.2 km || 
|-id=426 bgcolor=#E9E9E9
| 244426 ||  || — || August 28, 2002 || Palomar || NEAT || — || align=right | 1.1 km || 
|-id=427 bgcolor=#E9E9E9
| 244427 ||  || — || August 17, 2002 || Palomar || NEAT || HEN || align=right | 1.1 km || 
|-id=428 bgcolor=#E9E9E9
| 244428 ||  || — || August 27, 2002 || Palomar || NEAT || — || align=right | 2.6 km || 
|-id=429 bgcolor=#E9E9E9
| 244429 ||  || — || August 29, 2002 || Palomar || NEAT || — || align=right | 1.1 km || 
|-id=430 bgcolor=#E9E9E9
| 244430 ||  || — || August 18, 2002 || Palomar || NEAT || AGN || align=right | 1.5 km || 
|-id=431 bgcolor=#E9E9E9
| 244431 ||  || — || August 18, 2002 || Palomar || NEAT || — || align=right | 1.6 km || 
|-id=432 bgcolor=#E9E9E9
| 244432 ||  || — || August 18, 2002 || Palomar || NEAT || — || align=right | 2.8 km || 
|-id=433 bgcolor=#E9E9E9
| 244433 ||  || — || August 17, 2002 || Palomar || NEAT || — || align=right | 1.6 km || 
|-id=434 bgcolor=#E9E9E9
| 244434 ||  || — || August 16, 2002 || Palomar || NEAT || — || align=right | 2.6 km || 
|-id=435 bgcolor=#E9E9E9
| 244435 ||  || — || August 16, 2002 || Palomar || NEAT || WIT || align=right | 1.2 km || 
|-id=436 bgcolor=#d6d6d6
| 244436 ||  || — || September 3, 2002 || Haleakala || NEAT || — || align=right | 7.7 km || 
|-id=437 bgcolor=#d6d6d6
| 244437 ||  || — || September 4, 2002 || Palomar || NEAT || — || align=right | 3.3 km || 
|-id=438 bgcolor=#d6d6d6
| 244438 ||  || — || September 5, 2002 || Socorro || LINEAR || HIL3:2 || align=right | 7.7 km || 
|-id=439 bgcolor=#E9E9E9
| 244439 ||  || — || September 5, 2002 || Socorro || LINEAR || — || align=right | 1.5 km || 
|-id=440 bgcolor=#E9E9E9
| 244440 ||  || — || September 5, 2002 || Socorro || LINEAR || ADE || align=right | 2.3 km || 
|-id=441 bgcolor=#E9E9E9
| 244441 ||  || — || September 5, 2002 || Socorro || LINEAR || — || align=right | 3.5 km || 
|-id=442 bgcolor=#E9E9E9
| 244442 ||  || — || September 5, 2002 || Socorro || LINEAR || NEM || align=right | 3.3 km || 
|-id=443 bgcolor=#E9E9E9
| 244443 ||  || — || September 5, 2002 || Anderson Mesa || LONEOS || — || align=right | 6.0 km || 
|-id=444 bgcolor=#d6d6d6
| 244444 ||  || — || September 3, 2002 || Palomar || NEAT || — || align=right | 3.7 km || 
|-id=445 bgcolor=#E9E9E9
| 244445 ||  || — || September 4, 2002 || Anderson Mesa || LONEOS || HNA || align=right | 2.8 km || 
|-id=446 bgcolor=#E9E9E9
| 244446 ||  || — || September 4, 2002 || Palomar || NEAT || — || align=right | 2.3 km || 
|-id=447 bgcolor=#E9E9E9
| 244447 ||  || — || September 5, 2002 || Socorro || LINEAR || — || align=right | 2.0 km || 
|-id=448 bgcolor=#E9E9E9
| 244448 ||  || — || September 5, 2002 || Socorro || LINEAR || — || align=right | 3.1 km || 
|-id=449 bgcolor=#E9E9E9
| 244449 ||  || — || September 5, 2002 || Socorro || LINEAR || — || align=right | 2.7 km || 
|-id=450 bgcolor=#E9E9E9
| 244450 ||  || — || September 5, 2002 || Socorro || LINEAR || — || align=right | 4.2 km || 
|-id=451 bgcolor=#E9E9E9
| 244451 ||  || — || September 5, 2002 || Socorro || LINEAR || — || align=right | 3.4 km || 
|-id=452 bgcolor=#E9E9E9
| 244452 ||  || — || September 8, 2002 || Haleakala || NEAT || DOR || align=right | 3.9 km || 
|-id=453 bgcolor=#E9E9E9
| 244453 ||  || — || September 10, 2002 || Palomar || NEAT || ADE || align=right | 2.8 km || 
|-id=454 bgcolor=#d6d6d6
| 244454 ||  || — || September 11, 2002 || Palomar || NEAT || — || align=right | 5.0 km || 
|-id=455 bgcolor=#E9E9E9
| 244455 ||  || — || September 10, 2002 || Palomar || NEAT || — || align=right | 3.6 km || 
|-id=456 bgcolor=#FA8072
| 244456 ||  || — || September 10, 2002 || Haleakala || NEAT || — || align=right data-sort-value="0.82" | 820 m || 
|-id=457 bgcolor=#E9E9E9
| 244457 ||  || — || September 12, 2002 || Palomar || NEAT || — || align=right | 3.5 km || 
|-id=458 bgcolor=#E9E9E9
| 244458 ||  || — || September 11, 2002 || Palomar || NEAT || — || align=right | 1.7 km || 
|-id=459 bgcolor=#E9E9E9
| 244459 ||  || — || September 13, 2002 || Palomar || NEAT || — || align=right | 1.7 km || 
|-id=460 bgcolor=#d6d6d6
| 244460 ||  || — || September 13, 2002 || Kitt Peak || Spacewatch || VER || align=right | 5.1 km || 
|-id=461 bgcolor=#d6d6d6
| 244461 ||  || — || September 13, 2002 || Palomar || NEAT || — || align=right | 6.2 km || 
|-id=462 bgcolor=#E9E9E9
| 244462 ||  || — || September 13, 2002 || Palomar || NEAT || — || align=right | 3.6 km || 
|-id=463 bgcolor=#d6d6d6
| 244463 ||  || — || September 14, 2002 || Palomar || NEAT || CRO || align=right | 6.0 km || 
|-id=464 bgcolor=#E9E9E9
| 244464 ||  || — || September 14, 2002 || Kitt Peak || Spacewatch || — || align=right | 1.7 km || 
|-id=465 bgcolor=#d6d6d6
| 244465 ||  || — || September 12, 2002 || Palomar || NEAT || — || align=right | 4.6 km || 
|-id=466 bgcolor=#E9E9E9
| 244466 ||  || — || September 13, 2002 || Palomar || NEAT || — || align=right | 2.8 km || 
|-id=467 bgcolor=#E9E9E9
| 244467 ||  || — || September 14, 2002 || Palomar || NEAT || GEF || align=right | 1.9 km || 
|-id=468 bgcolor=#E9E9E9
| 244468 ||  || — || September 14, 2002 || Palomar || NEAT || — || align=right | 1.3 km || 
|-id=469 bgcolor=#d6d6d6
| 244469 ||  || — || September 14, 2002 || Haleakala || R. Matson || — || align=right | 3.7 km || 
|-id=470 bgcolor=#E9E9E9
| 244470 ||  || — || September 14, 2002 || Palomar || NEAT || — || align=right | 3.8 km || 
|-id=471 bgcolor=#E9E9E9
| 244471 ||  || — || September 12, 2002 || Palomar || NEAT || — || align=right | 2.0 km || 
|-id=472 bgcolor=#E9E9E9
| 244472 ||  || — || September 10, 2002 || Palomar || NEAT || — || align=right | 1.5 km || 
|-id=473 bgcolor=#E9E9E9
| 244473 ||  || — || September 1, 2002 || Palomar || NEAT || — || align=right | 2.7 km || 
|-id=474 bgcolor=#d6d6d6
| 244474 ||  || — || September 27, 2002 || Palomar || NEAT || LIX || align=right | 3.8 km || 
|-id=475 bgcolor=#d6d6d6
| 244475 ||  || — || September 27, 2002 || Palomar || NEAT || — || align=right | 3.9 km || 
|-id=476 bgcolor=#E9E9E9
| 244476 ||  || — || September 27, 2002 || Palomar || NEAT || MIT || align=right | 3.3 km || 
|-id=477 bgcolor=#E9E9E9
| 244477 ||  || — || September 26, 2002 || Palomar || NEAT || — || align=right | 1.6 km || 
|-id=478 bgcolor=#d6d6d6
| 244478 ||  || — || September 26, 2002 || Haleakala || NEAT || HIL3:2 || align=right | 10 km || 
|-id=479 bgcolor=#E9E9E9
| 244479 ||  || — || September 28, 2002 || Haleakala || NEAT || — || align=right | 1.9 km || 
|-id=480 bgcolor=#d6d6d6
| 244480 ||  || — || September 30, 2002 || Socorro || LINEAR || — || align=right | 3.5 km || 
|-id=481 bgcolor=#d6d6d6
| 244481 ||  || — || September 30, 2002 || Haleakala || NEAT || — || align=right | 5.9 km || 
|-id=482 bgcolor=#d6d6d6
| 244482 ||  || — || September 16, 2002 || Haleakala || NEAT || TRE || align=right | 3.5 km || 
|-id=483 bgcolor=#E9E9E9
| 244483 ||  || — || September 17, 2002 || Palomar || NEAT || — || align=right | 2.2 km || 
|-id=484 bgcolor=#E9E9E9
| 244484 ||  || — || September 29, 2002 || Haleakala || NEAT || — || align=right | 3.0 km || 
|-id=485 bgcolor=#d6d6d6
| 244485 ||  || — || October 1, 2002 || Anderson Mesa || LONEOS || — || align=right | 4.7 km || 
|-id=486 bgcolor=#d6d6d6
| 244486 ||  || — || October 1, 2002 || Anderson Mesa || LONEOS || URS || align=right | 6.9 km || 
|-id=487 bgcolor=#E9E9E9
| 244487 ||  || — || October 2, 2002 || Socorro || LINEAR || — || align=right | 1.9 km || 
|-id=488 bgcolor=#d6d6d6
| 244488 ||  || — || October 2, 2002 || Socorro || LINEAR || SHU3:2 || align=right | 8.6 km || 
|-id=489 bgcolor=#E9E9E9
| 244489 ||  || — || October 2, 2002 || Socorro || LINEAR || — || align=right | 1.5 km || 
|-id=490 bgcolor=#E9E9E9
| 244490 ||  || — || October 2, 2002 || Socorro || LINEAR || EUN || align=right | 2.0 km || 
|-id=491 bgcolor=#E9E9E9
| 244491 ||  || — || October 2, 2002 || Socorro || LINEAR || EUN || align=right | 1.9 km || 
|-id=492 bgcolor=#d6d6d6
| 244492 ||  || — || October 2, 2002 || Socorro || LINEAR || — || align=right | 4.0 km || 
|-id=493 bgcolor=#E9E9E9
| 244493 ||  || — || October 3, 2002 || Campo Imperatore || CINEOS || GEF || align=right | 1.9 km || 
|-id=494 bgcolor=#E9E9E9
| 244494 ||  || — || October 3, 2002 || Campo Imperatore || CINEOS || — || align=right | 2.6 km || 
|-id=495 bgcolor=#E9E9E9
| 244495 ||  || — || October 1, 2002 || Anderson Mesa || LONEOS || PAE || align=right | 4.0 km || 
|-id=496 bgcolor=#E9E9E9
| 244496 ||  || — || October 1, 2002 || Anderson Mesa || LONEOS || — || align=right | 3.9 km || 
|-id=497 bgcolor=#E9E9E9
| 244497 ||  || — || October 1, 2002 || Socorro || LINEAR || CLO || align=right | 3.5 km || 
|-id=498 bgcolor=#E9E9E9
| 244498 ||  || — || October 2, 2002 || Haleakala || NEAT || — || align=right | 4.6 km || 
|-id=499 bgcolor=#d6d6d6
| 244499 ||  || — || October 3, 2002 || Palomar || NEAT || EUP || align=right | 5.4 km || 
|-id=500 bgcolor=#d6d6d6
| 244500 ||  || — || October 2, 2002 || Socorro || LINEAR || — || align=right | 3.1 km || 
|}

244501–244600 

|-bgcolor=#d6d6d6
| 244501 ||  || — || October 3, 2002 || Palomar || NEAT || EMA || align=right | 5.5 km || 
|-id=502 bgcolor=#d6d6d6
| 244502 ||  || — || October 3, 2002 || Palomar || NEAT || ITH || align=right | 4.9 km || 
|-id=503 bgcolor=#d6d6d6
| 244503 ||  || — || October 4, 2002 || Palomar || NEAT || — || align=right | 4.2 km || 
|-id=504 bgcolor=#E9E9E9
| 244504 ||  || — || October 4, 2002 || Anderson Mesa || LONEOS || — || align=right | 3.8 km || 
|-id=505 bgcolor=#d6d6d6
| 244505 ||  || — || October 4, 2002 || Palomar || NEAT || — || align=right | 4.2 km || 
|-id=506 bgcolor=#E9E9E9
| 244506 ||  || — || October 4, 2002 || Anderson Mesa || LONEOS || — || align=right | 3.0 km || 
|-id=507 bgcolor=#d6d6d6
| 244507 ||  || — || October 5, 2002 || Socorro || LINEAR || NAE || align=right | 5.9 km || 
|-id=508 bgcolor=#d6d6d6
| 244508 ||  || — || October 5, 2002 || Socorro || LINEAR || — || align=right | 3.8 km || 
|-id=509 bgcolor=#E9E9E9
| 244509 ||  || — || October 5, 2002 || Palomar || NEAT || — || align=right | 3.4 km || 
|-id=510 bgcolor=#E9E9E9
| 244510 ||  || — || October 5, 2002 || Palomar || NEAT || JUN || align=right | 1.3 km || 
|-id=511 bgcolor=#E9E9E9
| 244511 ||  || — || October 5, 2002 || Palomar || NEAT || — || align=right | 3.7 km || 
|-id=512 bgcolor=#E9E9E9
| 244512 ||  || — || October 5, 2002 || Palomar || NEAT || EUN || align=right | 1.6 km || 
|-id=513 bgcolor=#E9E9E9
| 244513 ||  || — || October 3, 2002 || Palomar || NEAT || — || align=right | 3.4 km || 
|-id=514 bgcolor=#E9E9E9
| 244514 ||  || — || October 4, 2002 || Anderson Mesa || LONEOS || — || align=right | 2.4 km || 
|-id=515 bgcolor=#d6d6d6
| 244515 ||  || — || October 5, 2002 || Socorro || LINEAR || — || align=right | 5.8 km || 
|-id=516 bgcolor=#E9E9E9
| 244516 ||  || — || October 4, 2002 || Palomar || NEAT || — || align=right | 3.2 km || 
|-id=517 bgcolor=#d6d6d6
| 244517 ||  || — || October 5, 2002 || Anderson Mesa || LONEOS || — || align=right | 6.6 km || 
|-id=518 bgcolor=#E9E9E9
| 244518 ||  || — || October 6, 2002 || Anderson Mesa || LONEOS || — || align=right | 2.6 km || 
|-id=519 bgcolor=#d6d6d6
| 244519 ||  || — || October 4, 2002 || Socorro || LINEAR || — || align=right | 5.1 km || 
|-id=520 bgcolor=#E9E9E9
| 244520 ||  || — || October 5, 2002 || Socorro || LINEAR || — || align=right | 2.1 km || 
|-id=521 bgcolor=#E9E9E9
| 244521 ||  || — || October 7, 2002 || Haleakala || NEAT || — || align=right | 1.2 km || 
|-id=522 bgcolor=#E9E9E9
| 244522 ||  || — || October 7, 2002 || Socorro || LINEAR || PAL || align=right | 3.1 km || 
|-id=523 bgcolor=#E9E9E9
| 244523 ||  || — || October 7, 2002 || Anderson Mesa || LONEOS || — || align=right | 1.9 km || 
|-id=524 bgcolor=#E9E9E9
| 244524 ||  || — || October 7, 2002 || Socorro || LINEAR || — || align=right | 3.9 km || 
|-id=525 bgcolor=#d6d6d6
| 244525 ||  || — || October 6, 2002 || Socorro || LINEAR || URS || align=right | 5.8 km || 
|-id=526 bgcolor=#E9E9E9
| 244526 ||  || — || October 6, 2002 || Socorro || LINEAR || — || align=right | 4.9 km || 
|-id=527 bgcolor=#d6d6d6
| 244527 ||  || — || October 7, 2002 || Socorro || LINEAR || TIR || align=right | 4.9 km || 
|-id=528 bgcolor=#E9E9E9
| 244528 ||  || — || October 9, 2002 || Kitt Peak || Spacewatch || — || align=right | 3.3 km || 
|-id=529 bgcolor=#E9E9E9
| 244529 ||  || — || October 9, 2002 || Socorro || LINEAR || — || align=right | 2.7 km || 
|-id=530 bgcolor=#d6d6d6
| 244530 ||  || — || October 10, 2002 || Socorro || LINEAR || — || align=right | 4.8 km || 
|-id=531 bgcolor=#E9E9E9
| 244531 ||  || — || October 10, 2002 || Socorro || LINEAR || — || align=right | 2.1 km || 
|-id=532 bgcolor=#d6d6d6
| 244532 ||  || — || October 15, 2002 || Palomar || NEAT || — || align=right | 3.4 km || 
|-id=533 bgcolor=#E9E9E9
| 244533 ||  || — || October 5, 2002 || Palomar || NEAT || NEM || align=right | 2.4 km || 
|-id=534 bgcolor=#d6d6d6
| 244534 ||  || — || October 5, 2002 || Apache Point || SDSS || — || align=right | 2.5 km || 
|-id=535 bgcolor=#E9E9E9
| 244535 ||  || — || October 8, 2002 || Palomar || NEAT || — || align=right | 2.8 km || 
|-id=536 bgcolor=#fefefe
| 244536 ||  || — || October 28, 2002 || Socorro || LINEAR || H || align=right | 1.1 km || 
|-id=537 bgcolor=#E9E9E9
| 244537 ||  || — || October 31, 2002 || Socorro || LINEAR || — || align=right | 1.4 km || 
|-id=538 bgcolor=#E9E9E9
| 244538 ||  || — || October 30, 2002 || Socorro || LINEAR || — || align=right | 3.4 km || 
|-id=539 bgcolor=#d6d6d6
| 244539 ||  || — || October 31, 2002 || Palomar || NEAT || ALA || align=right | 6.3 km || 
|-id=540 bgcolor=#d6d6d6
| 244540 ||  || — || October 30, 2002 || Socorro || LINEAR || THB || align=right | 5.1 km || 
|-id=541 bgcolor=#d6d6d6
| 244541 ||  || — || October 31, 2002 || Socorro || LINEAR || THB || align=right | 4.8 km || 
|-id=542 bgcolor=#d6d6d6
| 244542 ||  || — || October 29, 2002 || Palomar || NEAT || 628 || align=right | 2.5 km || 
|-id=543 bgcolor=#d6d6d6
| 244543 ||  || — || October 16, 2002 || Palomar || NEAT || — || align=right | 3.1 km || 
|-id=544 bgcolor=#d6d6d6
| 244544 ||  || — || October 31, 2002 || Palomar || NEAT || — || align=right | 4.4 km || 
|-id=545 bgcolor=#E9E9E9
| 244545 ||  || — || October 29, 2002 || Palomar || NEAT || — || align=right | 2.3 km || 
|-id=546 bgcolor=#E9E9E9
| 244546 ||  || — || October 31, 2002 || Apache Point || SDSS || — || align=right | 2.8 km || 
|-id=547 bgcolor=#d6d6d6
| 244547 ||  || — || October 29, 2002 || Palomar || NEAT || — || align=right | 4.7 km || 
|-id=548 bgcolor=#E9E9E9
| 244548 ||  || — || November 1, 2002 || Palomar || NEAT || — || align=right | 3.7 km || 
|-id=549 bgcolor=#d6d6d6
| 244549 ||  || — || November 5, 2002 || Socorro || LINEAR || HYG || align=right | 3.7 km || 
|-id=550 bgcolor=#E9E9E9
| 244550 ||  || — || November 5, 2002 || Socorro || LINEAR || — || align=right | 3.6 km || 
|-id=551 bgcolor=#d6d6d6
| 244551 ||  || — || November 5, 2002 || Socorro || LINEAR || — || align=right | 4.6 km || 
|-id=552 bgcolor=#E9E9E9
| 244552 ||  || — || November 5, 2002 || Anderson Mesa || LONEOS || — || align=right | 3.8 km || 
|-id=553 bgcolor=#fefefe
| 244553 ||  || — || November 6, 2002 || Anderson Mesa || LONEOS || — || align=right | 1.1 km || 
|-id=554 bgcolor=#E9E9E9
| 244554 ||  || — || November 6, 2002 || Haleakala || NEAT || — || align=right | 1.7 km || 
|-id=555 bgcolor=#d6d6d6
| 244555 ||  || — || November 3, 2002 || Haleakala || NEAT || — || align=right | 5.5 km || 
|-id=556 bgcolor=#d6d6d6
| 244556 ||  || — || November 5, 2002 || Socorro || LINEAR || 7:4 || align=right | 4.8 km || 
|-id=557 bgcolor=#d6d6d6
| 244557 ||  || — || November 6, 2002 || Socorro || LINEAR || — || align=right | 5.4 km || 
|-id=558 bgcolor=#d6d6d6
| 244558 ||  || — || November 7, 2002 || Socorro || LINEAR || — || align=right | 5.6 km || 
|-id=559 bgcolor=#fefefe
| 244559 ||  || — || November 11, 2002 || Socorro || LINEAR || H || align=right | 1.0 km || 
|-id=560 bgcolor=#E9E9E9
| 244560 ||  || — || November 11, 2002 || Socorro || LINEAR || HNS || align=right | 2.0 km || 
|-id=561 bgcolor=#d6d6d6
| 244561 ||  || — || November 11, 2002 || Socorro || LINEAR || — || align=right | 7.7 km || 
|-id=562 bgcolor=#E9E9E9
| 244562 ||  || — || November 12, 2002 || Socorro || LINEAR || PAE || align=right | 4.3 km || 
|-id=563 bgcolor=#d6d6d6
| 244563 ||  || — || November 12, 2002 || Socorro || LINEAR || — || align=right | 4.7 km || 
|-id=564 bgcolor=#E9E9E9
| 244564 ||  || — || November 12, 2002 || Anderson Mesa || LONEOS || MIT || align=right | 3.8 km || 
|-id=565 bgcolor=#E9E9E9
| 244565 ||  || — || November 13, 2002 || Palomar || NEAT || MIT || align=right | 2.7 km || 
|-id=566 bgcolor=#E9E9E9
| 244566 ||  || — || November 13, 2002 || Palomar || NEAT || — || align=right | 2.7 km || 
|-id=567 bgcolor=#d6d6d6
| 244567 ||  || — || November 13, 2002 || Palomar || NEAT || EUP || align=right | 5.3 km || 
|-id=568 bgcolor=#E9E9E9
| 244568 ||  || — || November 13, 2002 || Palomar || NEAT || — || align=right | 4.1 km || 
|-id=569 bgcolor=#d6d6d6
| 244569 ||  || — || November 1, 2002 || Palomar || NEAT || — || align=right | 4.5 km || 
|-id=570 bgcolor=#d6d6d6
| 244570 ||  || — || November 15, 2002 || Palomar || NEAT || — || align=right | 4.2 km || 
|-id=571 bgcolor=#E9E9E9
| 244571 ||  || — || November 21, 2002 || Palomar || NEAT || — || align=right | 5.1 km || 
|-id=572 bgcolor=#E9E9E9
| 244572 ||  || — || November 23, 2002 || Palomar || NEAT || — || align=right | 3.5 km || 
|-id=573 bgcolor=#d6d6d6
| 244573 ||  || — || November 25, 2002 || Palomar || NEAT || — || align=right | 4.3 km || 
|-id=574 bgcolor=#fefefe
| 244574 ||  || — || November 28, 2002 || Anderson Mesa || LONEOS || V || align=right | 1.2 km || 
|-id=575 bgcolor=#d6d6d6
| 244575 ||  || — || December 1, 2002 || Haleakala || NEAT || — || align=right | 5.0 km || 
|-id=576 bgcolor=#d6d6d6
| 244576 ||  || — || December 1, 2002 || Socorro || LINEAR || TIR || align=right | 3.7 km || 
|-id=577 bgcolor=#fefefe
| 244577 ||  || — || December 2, 2002 || Socorro || LINEAR || PHO || align=right | 1.6 km || 
|-id=578 bgcolor=#d6d6d6
| 244578 ||  || — || December 1, 2002 || Socorro || LINEAR || — || align=right | 4.2 km || 
|-id=579 bgcolor=#E9E9E9
| 244579 ||  || — || December 2, 2002 || Socorro || LINEAR || — || align=right | 4.0 km || 
|-id=580 bgcolor=#d6d6d6
| 244580 ||  || — || December 2, 2002 || Socorro || LINEAR || URS || align=right | 5.2 km || 
|-id=581 bgcolor=#d6d6d6
| 244581 ||  || — || December 2, 2002 || Socorro || LINEAR || — || align=right | 4.2 km || 
|-id=582 bgcolor=#E9E9E9
| 244582 ||  || — || December 2, 2002 || Haleakala || NEAT || — || align=right | 2.6 km || 
|-id=583 bgcolor=#E9E9E9
| 244583 ||  || — || December 3, 2002 || Palomar || NEAT || EUN || align=right | 1.9 km || 
|-id=584 bgcolor=#E9E9E9
| 244584 ||  || — || December 6, 2002 || Socorro || LINEAR || ADE || align=right | 2.8 km || 
|-id=585 bgcolor=#E9E9E9
| 244585 ||  || — || December 6, 2002 || Socorro || LINEAR || — || align=right | 2.1 km || 
|-id=586 bgcolor=#E9E9E9
| 244586 ||  || — || December 6, 2002 || Socorro || LINEAR || EUN || align=right | 1.8 km || 
|-id=587 bgcolor=#E9E9E9
| 244587 ||  || — || December 10, 2002 || Socorro || LINEAR || — || align=right | 3.7 km || 
|-id=588 bgcolor=#d6d6d6
| 244588 ||  || — || December 10, 2002 || Palomar || NEAT || — || align=right | 6.9 km || 
|-id=589 bgcolor=#d6d6d6
| 244589 ||  || — || December 11, 2002 || Socorro || LINEAR || EOS || align=right | 3.2 km || 
|-id=590 bgcolor=#d6d6d6
| 244590 ||  || — || December 11, 2002 || Socorro || LINEAR || — || align=right | 4.1 km || 
|-id=591 bgcolor=#d6d6d6
| 244591 ||  || — || December 11, 2002 || Socorro || LINEAR || URS || align=right | 4.4 km || 
|-id=592 bgcolor=#fefefe
| 244592 ||  || — || December 5, 2002 || Socorro || LINEAR || — || align=right | 3.0 km || 
|-id=593 bgcolor=#d6d6d6
| 244593 ||  || — || December 10, 2002 || Palomar || NEAT || — || align=right | 4.4 km || 
|-id=594 bgcolor=#d6d6d6
| 244594 ||  || — || December 13, 2002 || Palomar || NEAT || JLI || align=right | 5.2 km || 
|-id=595 bgcolor=#E9E9E9
| 244595 ||  || — || December 13, 2002 || Anderson Mesa || LONEOS || — || align=right | 3.1 km || 
|-id=596 bgcolor=#d6d6d6
| 244596 ||  || — || December 11, 2002 || Palomar || NEAT || EUP || align=right | 4.8 km || 
|-id=597 bgcolor=#E9E9E9
| 244597 ||  || — || December 13, 2002 || Socorro || LINEAR || — || align=right | 4.3 km || 
|-id=598 bgcolor=#E9E9E9
| 244598 ||  || — || December 14, 2002 || Socorro || LINEAR || — || align=right | 4.3 km || 
|-id=599 bgcolor=#d6d6d6
| 244599 ||  || — || December 3, 2002 || Palomar || NEAT || — || align=right | 3.0 km || 
|-id=600 bgcolor=#d6d6d6
| 244600 ||  || — || December 10, 2002 || Palomar || NEAT || — || align=right | 3.6 km || 
|}

244601–244700 

|-bgcolor=#E9E9E9
| 244601 ||  || — || December 27, 2002 || Anderson Mesa || LONEOS || — || align=right | 4.9 km || 
|-id=602 bgcolor=#E9E9E9
| 244602 ||  || — || December 28, 2002 || Socorro || LINEAR || — || align=right | 5.4 km || 
|-id=603 bgcolor=#d6d6d6
| 244603 ||  || — || December 31, 2002 || Socorro || LINEAR || — || align=right | 7.2 km || 
|-id=604 bgcolor=#E9E9E9
| 244604 ||  || — || December 31, 2002 || Socorro || LINEAR || — || align=right | 2.7 km || 
|-id=605 bgcolor=#fefefe
| 244605 ||  || — || December 31, 2002 || Socorro || LINEAR || FLO || align=right data-sort-value="0.92" | 920 m || 
|-id=606 bgcolor=#d6d6d6
| 244606 ||  || — || December 31, 2002 || Socorro || LINEAR || 7:4 || align=right | 3.3 km || 
|-id=607 bgcolor=#E9E9E9
| 244607 ||  || — || December 31, 2002 || Socorro || LINEAR || — || align=right | 5.1 km || 
|-id=608 bgcolor=#d6d6d6
| 244608 ||  || — || January 1, 2003 || Socorro || LINEAR || — || align=right | 4.5 km || 
|-id=609 bgcolor=#fefefe
| 244609 ||  || — || January 2, 2003 || Socorro || LINEAR || — || align=right data-sort-value="0.98" | 980 m || 
|-id=610 bgcolor=#d6d6d6
| 244610 ||  || — || January 1, 2003 || Socorro || LINEAR || — || align=right | 4.2 km || 
|-id=611 bgcolor=#E9E9E9
| 244611 ||  || — || January 1, 2003 || Socorro || LINEAR || — || align=right | 4.2 km || 
|-id=612 bgcolor=#d6d6d6
| 244612 ||  || — || January 5, 2003 || Socorro || LINEAR || TEL || align=right | 2.3 km || 
|-id=613 bgcolor=#d6d6d6
| 244613 ||  || — || January 7, 2003 || Socorro || LINEAR || — || align=right | 6.4 km || 
|-id=614 bgcolor=#d6d6d6
| 244614 ||  || — || January 5, 2003 || Socorro || LINEAR || EUP || align=right | 6.6 km || 
|-id=615 bgcolor=#fefefe
| 244615 ||  || — || January 5, 2003 || Socorro || LINEAR || — || align=right | 1.1 km || 
|-id=616 bgcolor=#d6d6d6
| 244616 ||  || — || January 8, 2003 || Socorro || LINEAR || EUP || align=right | 7.1 km || 
|-id=617 bgcolor=#E9E9E9
| 244617 ||  || — || January 7, 2003 || Socorro || LINEAR || EUN || align=right | 2.4 km || 
|-id=618 bgcolor=#d6d6d6
| 244618 ||  || — || January 10, 2003 || Socorro || LINEAR || — || align=right | 6.6 km || 
|-id=619 bgcolor=#E9E9E9
| 244619 ||  || — || January 2, 2003 || Socorro || LINEAR || MIT || align=right | 3.5 km || 
|-id=620 bgcolor=#d6d6d6
| 244620 ||  || — || January 2, 2003 || Socorro || LINEAR || EUP || align=right | 5.0 km || 
|-id=621 bgcolor=#d6d6d6
| 244621 ||  || — || January 26, 2003 || Anderson Mesa || LONEOS || — || align=right | 5.2 km || 
|-id=622 bgcolor=#fefefe
| 244622 ||  || — || January 26, 2003 || Haleakala || NEAT || FLO || align=right | 1.1 km || 
|-id=623 bgcolor=#d6d6d6
| 244623 ||  || — || January 26, 2003 || Haleakala || NEAT || 627 || align=right | 5.1 km || 
|-id=624 bgcolor=#d6d6d6
| 244624 ||  || — || January 27, 2003 || Socorro || LINEAR || URS || align=right | 4.8 km || 
|-id=625 bgcolor=#E9E9E9
| 244625 ||  || — || January 25, 2003 || Palomar || NEAT || — || align=right | 3.0 km || 
|-id=626 bgcolor=#fefefe
| 244626 ||  || — || January 27, 2003 || Anderson Mesa || LONEOS || — || align=right | 1.1 km || 
|-id=627 bgcolor=#fefefe
| 244627 ||  || — || January 27, 2003 || Socorro || LINEAR || — || align=right | 1.1 km || 
|-id=628 bgcolor=#d6d6d6
| 244628 ||  || — || January 27, 2003 || Socorro || LINEAR || EUP || align=right | 5.1 km || 
|-id=629 bgcolor=#E9E9E9
| 244629 ||  || — || January 27, 2003 || Socorro || LINEAR || IAN || align=right | 1.9 km || 
|-id=630 bgcolor=#E9E9E9
| 244630 ||  || — || January 27, 2003 || Socorro || LINEAR || PAD || align=right | 3.1 km || 
|-id=631 bgcolor=#E9E9E9
| 244631 ||  || — || January 31, 2003 || Kitt Peak || Spacewatch || — || align=right | 4.3 km || 
|-id=632 bgcolor=#fefefe
| 244632 ||  || — || January 29, 2003 || Palomar || NEAT || — || align=right | 1.6 km || 
|-id=633 bgcolor=#d6d6d6
| 244633 ||  || — || January 29, 2003 || Palomar || NEAT || — || align=right | 4.5 km || 
|-id=634 bgcolor=#fefefe
| 244634 ||  || — || February 4, 2003 || Socorro || LINEAR || FLO || align=right data-sort-value="0.74" | 740 m || 
|-id=635 bgcolor=#fefefe
| 244635 ||  || — || February 22, 2003 || Kitt Peak || Spacewatch || — || align=right data-sort-value="0.83" | 830 m || 
|-id=636 bgcolor=#fefefe
| 244636 ||  || — || March 5, 2003 || Socorro || LINEAR || — || align=right | 1.2 km || 
|-id=637 bgcolor=#d6d6d6
| 244637 ||  || — || March 6, 2003 || Anderson Mesa || LONEOS || — || align=right | 4.4 km || 
|-id=638 bgcolor=#fefefe
| 244638 ||  || — || March 6, 2003 || Anderson Mesa || LONEOS || — || align=right data-sort-value="0.95" | 950 m || 
|-id=639 bgcolor=#fefefe
| 244639 ||  || — || March 6, 2003 || Anderson Mesa || LONEOS || — || align=right data-sort-value="0.86" | 860 m || 
|-id=640 bgcolor=#fefefe
| 244640 ||  || — || March 8, 2003 || Anderson Mesa || LONEOS || FLO || align=right data-sort-value="0.77" | 770 m || 
|-id=641 bgcolor=#fefefe
| 244641 ||  || — || March 23, 2003 || Kitt Peak || Spacewatch || — || align=right data-sort-value="0.89" | 890 m || 
|-id=642 bgcolor=#fefefe
| 244642 ||  || — || March 23, 2003 || Palomar || NEAT || — || align=right | 1.3 km || 
|-id=643 bgcolor=#fefefe
| 244643 ||  || — || March 24, 2003 || Kitt Peak || Spacewatch || FLO || align=right data-sort-value="0.76" | 760 m || 
|-id=644 bgcolor=#d6d6d6
| 244644 ||  || — || March 24, 2003 || Kitt Peak || Spacewatch || — || align=right | 5.4 km || 
|-id=645 bgcolor=#E9E9E9
| 244645 ||  || — || March 27, 2003 || Palomar || NEAT || HNS || align=right | 2.6 km || 
|-id=646 bgcolor=#fefefe
| 244646 ||  || — || March 28, 2003 || Kitt Peak || Spacewatch || — || align=right | 1.1 km || 
|-id=647 bgcolor=#fefefe
| 244647 ||  || — || March 30, 2003 || Anderson Mesa || LONEOS || — || align=right | 1.3 km || 
|-id=648 bgcolor=#d6d6d6
| 244648 ||  || — || March 26, 2003 || Anderson Mesa || LONEOS || — || align=right | 4.2 km || 
|-id=649 bgcolor=#fefefe
| 244649 ||  || — || March 23, 2003 || Kitt Peak || Spacewatch || — || align=right | 1.4 km || 
|-id=650 bgcolor=#E9E9E9
| 244650 ||  || — || April 1, 2003 || Socorro || LINEAR || — || align=right | 4.3 km || 
|-id=651 bgcolor=#fefefe
| 244651 ||  || — || April 1, 2003 || Socorro || LINEAR || V || align=right | 1.0 km || 
|-id=652 bgcolor=#fefefe
| 244652 ||  || — || April 1, 2003 || Socorro || LINEAR || V || align=right | 1.0 km || 
|-id=653 bgcolor=#fefefe
| 244653 ||  || — || April 8, 2003 || Kitt Peak || Spacewatch || — || align=right data-sort-value="0.91" | 910 m || 
|-id=654 bgcolor=#d6d6d6
| 244654 ||  || — || April 25, 2003 || Campo Imperatore || CINEOS || — || align=right | 7.3 km || 
|-id=655 bgcolor=#fefefe
| 244655 ||  || — || April 25, 2003 || Kitt Peak || Spacewatch || — || align=right | 1.5 km || 
|-id=656 bgcolor=#fefefe
| 244656 ||  || — || April 25, 2003 || Campo Imperatore || CINEOS || V || align=right | 1.1 km || 
|-id=657 bgcolor=#fefefe
| 244657 ||  || — || April 25, 2003 || Kitt Peak || Spacewatch || — || align=right data-sort-value="0.82" | 820 m || 
|-id=658 bgcolor=#d6d6d6
| 244658 ||  || — || April 24, 2003 || Anderson Mesa || LONEOS || — || align=right | 7.3 km || 
|-id=659 bgcolor=#fefefe
| 244659 ||  || — || April 26, 2003 || Kitt Peak || Spacewatch || V || align=right data-sort-value="0.61" | 610 m || 
|-id=660 bgcolor=#fefefe
| 244660 ||  || — || April 27, 2003 || Anderson Mesa || LONEOS || — || align=right | 1.1 km || 
|-id=661 bgcolor=#fefefe
| 244661 ||  || — || April 28, 2003 || Haleakala || NEAT || — || align=right | 1.1 km || 
|-id=662 bgcolor=#fefefe
| 244662 ||  || — || April 26, 2003 || Haleakala || NEAT || — || align=right | 1.1 km || 
|-id=663 bgcolor=#fefefe
| 244663 ||  || — || April 30, 2003 || Reedy Creek || J. Broughton || — || align=right | 1.4 km || 
|-id=664 bgcolor=#fefefe
| 244664 ||  || — || April 22, 2003 || Goodricke-Pigott || J. W. Kessel || — || align=right | 1.1 km || 
|-id=665 bgcolor=#fefefe
| 244665 ||  || — || April 28, 2003 || Socorro || LINEAR || — || align=right | 1.8 km || 
|-id=666 bgcolor=#FA8072
| 244666 ||  || — || May 1, 2003 || Socorro || LINEAR || H || align=right data-sort-value="0.79" | 790 m || 
|-id=667 bgcolor=#fefefe
| 244667 ||  || — || May 1, 2003 || Socorro || LINEAR || — || align=right | 1.7 km || 
|-id=668 bgcolor=#d6d6d6
| 244668 ||  || — || May 25, 2003 || Kitt Peak || Spacewatch || — || align=right | 5.7 km || 
|-id=669 bgcolor=#fefefe
| 244669 ||  || — || May 25, 2003 || Kitt Peak || Spacewatch || FLO || align=right data-sort-value="0.85" | 850 m || 
|-id=670 bgcolor=#FFC2E0
| 244670 ||  || — || May 28, 2003 || Kitt Peak || Spacewatch || APO || align=right data-sort-value="0.77" | 770 m || 
|-id=671 bgcolor=#d6d6d6
| 244671 ||  || — || May 27, 2003 || Kitt Peak || Spacewatch || — || align=right | 4.2 km || 
|-id=672 bgcolor=#fefefe
| 244672 ||  || — || June 25, 2003 || Socorro || LINEAR || — || align=right | 1.1 km || 
|-id=673 bgcolor=#E9E9E9
| 244673 ||  || — || June 25, 2003 || Socorro || LINEAR || — || align=right | 5.1 km || 
|-id=674 bgcolor=#E9E9E9
| 244674 ||  || — || July 6, 2003 || Socorro || LINEAR || — || align=right | 6.0 km || 
|-id=675 bgcolor=#fefefe
| 244675 ||  || — || July 7, 2003 || Reedy Creek || J. Broughton || — || align=right | 1.5 km || 
|-id=676 bgcolor=#fefefe
| 244676 ||  || — || July 9, 2003 || Kitt Peak || Spacewatch || — || align=right | 1.6 km || 
|-id=677 bgcolor=#fefefe
| 244677 ||  || — || July 8, 2003 || Palomar || NEAT || — || align=right | 1.4 km || 
|-id=678 bgcolor=#fefefe
| 244678 ||  || — || July 20, 2003 || Socorro || LINEAR || — || align=right | 1.7 km || 
|-id=679 bgcolor=#FA8072
| 244679 ||  || — || July 25, 2003 || Reedy Creek || J. Broughton || — || align=right | 1.1 km || 
|-id=680 bgcolor=#fefefe
| 244680 ||  || — || July 25, 2003 || Socorro || LINEAR || — || align=right data-sort-value="0.81" | 810 m || 
|-id=681 bgcolor=#fefefe
| 244681 ||  || — || July 30, 2003 || Reedy Creek || J. Broughton || — || align=right | 1.4 km || 
|-id=682 bgcolor=#E9E9E9
| 244682 ||  || — || July 28, 2003 || Haleakala || NEAT || — || align=right | 1.7 km || 
|-id=683 bgcolor=#fefefe
| 244683 ||  || — || July 30, 2003 || Socorro || LINEAR || — || align=right | 1.4 km || 
|-id=684 bgcolor=#fefefe
| 244684 ||  || — || July 28, 2003 || Bergisch Gladbach || W. Bickel || — || align=right | 1.4 km || 
|-id=685 bgcolor=#fefefe
| 244685 ||  || — || July 24, 2003 || Palomar || NEAT || V || align=right data-sort-value="0.99" | 990 m || 
|-id=686 bgcolor=#E9E9E9
| 244686 ||  || — || July 24, 2003 || Palomar || NEAT || MAR || align=right | 1.5 km || 
|-id=687 bgcolor=#E9E9E9
| 244687 ||  || — || July 25, 2003 || Socorro || LINEAR || — || align=right | 4.2 km || 
|-id=688 bgcolor=#E9E9E9
| 244688 ||  || — || July 25, 2003 || Socorro || LINEAR || — || align=right | 1.7 km || 
|-id=689 bgcolor=#FA8072
| 244689 ||  || — || August 1, 2003 || Socorro || LINEAR || — || align=right | 1.1 km || 
|-id=690 bgcolor=#fefefe
| 244690 ||  || — || August 1, 2003 || Haleakala || NEAT || — || align=right | 1.5 km || 
|-id=691 bgcolor=#fefefe
| 244691 ||  || — || August 17, 2003 || Haleakala || NEAT || — || align=right | 1.2 km || 
|-id=692 bgcolor=#fefefe
| 244692 ||  || — || August 19, 2003 || Campo Imperatore || CINEOS || — || align=right | 1.9 km || 
|-id=693 bgcolor=#E9E9E9
| 244693 ||  || — || August 17, 2003 || Haleakala || NEAT || DOR || align=right | 3.3 km || 
|-id=694 bgcolor=#FA8072
| 244694 ||  || — || August 20, 2003 || Campo Imperatore || CINEOS || — || align=right | 1.0 km || 
|-id=695 bgcolor=#fefefe
| 244695 ||  || — || August 21, 2003 || Socorro || LINEAR || PHO || align=right | 1.2 km || 
|-id=696 bgcolor=#fefefe
| 244696 ||  || — || August 21, 2003 || Campo Imperatore || CINEOS || NYS || align=right data-sort-value="0.86" | 860 m || 
|-id=697 bgcolor=#fefefe
| 244697 ||  || — || August 20, 2003 || Palomar || NEAT || — || align=right | 1.0 km || 
|-id=698 bgcolor=#fefefe
| 244698 ||  || — || August 20, 2003 || Campo Imperatore || CINEOS || NYS || align=right data-sort-value="0.68" | 680 m || 
|-id=699 bgcolor=#d6d6d6
| 244699 ||  || — || August 22, 2003 || Palomar || NEAT || THM || align=right | 5.9 km || 
|-id=700 bgcolor=#fefefe
| 244700 ||  || — || August 22, 2003 || Palomar || NEAT || NYS || align=right data-sort-value="0.88" | 880 m || 
|}

244701–244800 

|-bgcolor=#fefefe
| 244701 ||  || — || August 22, 2003 || Palomar || NEAT || — || align=right | 1.4 km || 
|-id=702 bgcolor=#fefefe
| 244702 ||  || — || August 21, 2003 || Campo Imperatore || CINEOS || PHO || align=right | 1.2 km || 
|-id=703 bgcolor=#fefefe
| 244703 ||  || — || August 21, 2003 || Campo Imperatore || CINEOS || V || align=right | 1.0 km || 
|-id=704 bgcolor=#fefefe
| 244704 ||  || — || August 22, 2003 || Haleakala || NEAT || — || align=right | 2.5 km || 
|-id=705 bgcolor=#E9E9E9
| 244705 ||  || — || August 23, 2003 || Črni Vrh || Črni Vrh || — || align=right | 1.5 km || 
|-id=706 bgcolor=#fefefe
| 244706 ||  || — || August 22, 2003 || Palomar || NEAT || MAS || align=right | 1.0 km || 
|-id=707 bgcolor=#fefefe
| 244707 ||  || — || August 22, 2003 || Socorro || LINEAR || NYS || align=right data-sort-value="0.91" | 910 m || 
|-id=708 bgcolor=#fefefe
| 244708 ||  || — || August 22, 2003 || Palomar || NEAT || NYS || align=right | 1.1 km || 
|-id=709 bgcolor=#fefefe
| 244709 ||  || — || August 23, 2003 || Palomar || NEAT || KLI || align=right | 3.0 km || 
|-id=710 bgcolor=#fefefe
| 244710 ||  || — || August 22, 2003 || Haleakala || NEAT || H || align=right data-sort-value="0.77" | 770 m || 
|-id=711 bgcolor=#fefefe
| 244711 ||  || — || August 23, 2003 || Palomar || NEAT || — || align=right | 1.2 km || 
|-id=712 bgcolor=#fefefe
| 244712 ||  || — || August 23, 2003 || Socorro || LINEAR || MAS || align=right | 1.1 km || 
|-id=713 bgcolor=#E9E9E9
| 244713 ||  || — || August 23, 2003 || Socorro || LINEAR || — || align=right | 2.0 km || 
|-id=714 bgcolor=#fefefe
| 244714 ||  || — || August 23, 2003 || Socorro || LINEAR || ERI || align=right | 2.7 km || 
|-id=715 bgcolor=#E9E9E9
| 244715 ||  || — || August 23, 2003 || Socorro || LINEAR || — || align=right | 1.5 km || 
|-id=716 bgcolor=#fefefe
| 244716 ||  || — || August 25, 2003 || Socorro || LINEAR || V || align=right data-sort-value="0.99" | 990 m || 
|-id=717 bgcolor=#d6d6d6
| 244717 ||  || — || August 25, 2003 || Palomar || NEAT || — || align=right | 5.6 km || 
|-id=718 bgcolor=#fefefe
| 244718 ||  || — || August 24, 2003 || Socorro || LINEAR || SVE || align=right | 2.8 km || 
|-id=719 bgcolor=#E9E9E9
| 244719 ||  || — || August 24, 2003 || Socorro || LINEAR || — || align=right | 3.3 km || 
|-id=720 bgcolor=#d6d6d6
| 244720 ||  || — || August 23, 2003 || Palomar || NEAT || — || align=right | 3.4 km || 
|-id=721 bgcolor=#fefefe
| 244721 ||  || — || August 24, 2003 || Socorro || LINEAR || — || align=right | 2.5 km || 
|-id=722 bgcolor=#fefefe
| 244722 ||  || — || August 24, 2003 || Palomar || NEAT || V || align=right | 1.1 km || 
|-id=723 bgcolor=#fefefe
| 244723 ||  || — || August 30, 2003 || Haleakala || NEAT || — || align=right | 1.0 km || 
|-id=724 bgcolor=#fefefe
| 244724 ||  || — || August 28, 2003 || Socorro || LINEAR || V || align=right | 1.0 km || 
|-id=725 bgcolor=#fefefe
| 244725 ||  || — || August 31, 2003 || Socorro || LINEAR || MAS || align=right | 1.1 km || 
|-id=726 bgcolor=#fefefe
| 244726 ||  || — || August 31, 2003 || Socorro || LINEAR || FLO || align=right | 1.5 km || 
|-id=727 bgcolor=#fefefe
| 244727 ||  || — || August 21, 2003 || Campo Imperatore || CINEOS || NYS || align=right data-sort-value="0.74" | 740 m || 
|-id=728 bgcolor=#fefefe
| 244728 ||  || — || September 4, 2003 || Črni Vrh || Črni Vrh || ERI || align=right | 1.4 km || 
|-id=729 bgcolor=#fefefe
| 244729 ||  || — || September 4, 2003 || Socorro || LINEAR || KLI || align=right | 3.7 km || 
|-id=730 bgcolor=#fefefe
| 244730 ||  || — || September 13, 2003 || Haleakala || NEAT || ERI || align=right | 2.0 km || 
|-id=731 bgcolor=#fefefe
| 244731 ||  || — || September 14, 2003 || Haleakala || NEAT || — || align=right | 1.2 km || 
|-id=732 bgcolor=#fefefe
| 244732 ||  || — || September 14, 2003 || Haleakala || NEAT || — || align=right | 2.7 km || 
|-id=733 bgcolor=#d6d6d6
| 244733 ||  || — || September 15, 2003 || Palomar || NEAT || — || align=right | 5.5 km || 
|-id=734 bgcolor=#E9E9E9
| 244734 ||  || — || September 15, 2003 || Haleakala || NEAT || — || align=right | 2.8 km || 
|-id=735 bgcolor=#fefefe
| 244735 ||  || — || September 3, 2003 || Socorro || LINEAR || — || align=right | 2.7 km || 
|-id=736 bgcolor=#d6d6d6
| 244736 ||  || — || September 17, 2003 || Kitt Peak || Spacewatch || — || align=right | 4.1 km || 
|-id=737 bgcolor=#E9E9E9
| 244737 ||  || — || September 16, 2003 || Kitt Peak || Spacewatch || — || align=right | 3.1 km || 
|-id=738 bgcolor=#fefefe
| 244738 ||  || — || September 17, 2003 || Haleakala || NEAT || — || align=right | 1.4 km || 
|-id=739 bgcolor=#FA8072
| 244739 ||  || — || September 18, 2003 || Palomar || NEAT || — || align=right | 1.0 km || 
|-id=740 bgcolor=#fefefe
| 244740 ||  || — || September 18, 2003 || Kitt Peak || Spacewatch || MAS || align=right data-sort-value="0.83" | 830 m || 
|-id=741 bgcolor=#fefefe
| 244741 ||  || — || September 18, 2003 || Socorro || LINEAR || — || align=right | 1.2 km || 
|-id=742 bgcolor=#fefefe
| 244742 ||  || — || September 17, 2003 || Haleakala || NEAT || — || align=right | 1.4 km || 
|-id=743 bgcolor=#fefefe
| 244743 ||  || — || September 16, 2003 || Palomar || NEAT || — || align=right | 1.1 km || 
|-id=744 bgcolor=#d6d6d6
| 244744 ||  || — || September 16, 2003 || Palomar || NEAT || — || align=right | 2.6 km || 
|-id=745 bgcolor=#fefefe
| 244745 ||  || — || September 16, 2003 || Anderson Mesa || LONEOS || — || align=right | 1.8 km || 
|-id=746 bgcolor=#E9E9E9
| 244746 ||  || — || September 16, 2003 || Anderson Mesa || LONEOS || — || align=right | 2.7 km || 
|-id=747 bgcolor=#fefefe
| 244747 ||  || — || September 16, 2003 || Anderson Mesa || LONEOS || — || align=right | 1.3 km || 
|-id=748 bgcolor=#fefefe
| 244748 ||  || — || September 19, 2003 || Palomar || NEAT || — || align=right | 1.4 km || 
|-id=749 bgcolor=#E9E9E9
| 244749 ||  || — || September 16, 2003 || Anderson Mesa || LONEOS || GER || align=right | 2.1 km || 
|-id=750 bgcolor=#fefefe
| 244750 ||  || — || September 16, 2003 || Kitt Peak || Spacewatch || — || align=right | 1.0 km || 
|-id=751 bgcolor=#E9E9E9
| 244751 ||  || — || September 16, 2003 || Kitt Peak || Spacewatch || AER || align=right | 2.1 km || 
|-id=752 bgcolor=#fefefe
| 244752 ||  || — || September 17, 2003 || Socorro || LINEAR || MAS || align=right data-sort-value="0.94" | 940 m || 
|-id=753 bgcolor=#fefefe
| 244753 ||  || — || September 17, 2003 || Socorro || LINEAR || — || align=right | 1.2 km || 
|-id=754 bgcolor=#E9E9E9
| 244754 ||  || — || September 17, 2003 || Kitt Peak || Spacewatch || — || align=right | 3.3 km || 
|-id=755 bgcolor=#fefefe
| 244755 ||  || — || September 18, 2003 || Socorro || LINEAR || — || align=right | 1.1 km || 
|-id=756 bgcolor=#d6d6d6
| 244756 ||  || — || September 19, 2003 || Kitt Peak || Spacewatch || KAR || align=right | 1.3 km || 
|-id=757 bgcolor=#E9E9E9
| 244757 ||  || — || September 17, 2003 || Kitt Peak || Spacewatch || — || align=right | 1.8 km || 
|-id=758 bgcolor=#fefefe
| 244758 ||  || — || September 20, 2003 || Socorro || LINEAR || CHL || align=right | 2.1 km || 
|-id=759 bgcolor=#E9E9E9
| 244759 ||  || — || September 16, 2003 || Palomar || NEAT || — || align=right | 3.7 km || 
|-id=760 bgcolor=#E9E9E9
| 244760 ||  || — || September 18, 2003 || Palomar || NEAT || — || align=right | 3.4 km || 
|-id=761 bgcolor=#fefefe
| 244761 ||  || — || September 19, 2003 || Kitt Peak || Spacewatch || MAS || align=right | 1.2 km || 
|-id=762 bgcolor=#E9E9E9
| 244762 ||  || — || September 19, 2003 || Haleakala || NEAT || — || align=right | 4.3 km || 
|-id=763 bgcolor=#E9E9E9
| 244763 ||  || — || September 20, 2003 || Socorro || LINEAR || — || align=right | 1.6 km || 
|-id=764 bgcolor=#fefefe
| 244764 ||  || — || September 20, 2003 || Palomar || NEAT || — || align=right | 1.4 km || 
|-id=765 bgcolor=#E9E9E9
| 244765 ||  || — || September 20, 2003 || Kitt Peak || Spacewatch || — || align=right | 1.2 km || 
|-id=766 bgcolor=#fefefe
| 244766 ||  || — || September 16, 2003 || Kitt Peak || Spacewatch || — || align=right | 1.5 km || 
|-id=767 bgcolor=#fefefe
| 244767 ||  || — || September 16, 2003 || Palomar || NEAT || FLO || align=right | 1.3 km || 
|-id=768 bgcolor=#fefefe
| 244768 ||  || — || September 19, 2003 || Haleakala || NEAT || V || align=right | 1.1 km || 
|-id=769 bgcolor=#fefefe
| 244769 ||  || — || September 18, 2003 || Kitt Peak || Spacewatch || — || align=right | 1.6 km || 
|-id=770 bgcolor=#E9E9E9
| 244770 ||  || — || September 18, 2003 || Palomar || NEAT || — || align=right | 3.3 km || 
|-id=771 bgcolor=#E9E9E9
| 244771 ||  || — || September 19, 2003 || Kitt Peak || Spacewatch || — || align=right | 2.8 km || 
|-id=772 bgcolor=#fefefe
| 244772 ||  || — || September 20, 2003 || Socorro || LINEAR || FLO || align=right | 1.5 km || 
|-id=773 bgcolor=#E9E9E9
| 244773 ||  || — || September 19, 2003 || Palomar || NEAT || EUN || align=right | 2.0 km || 
|-id=774 bgcolor=#fefefe
| 244774 ||  || — || September 20, 2003 || Palomar || NEAT || V || align=right | 1.3 km || 
|-id=775 bgcolor=#fefefe
| 244775 ||  || — || September 16, 2003 || Kitt Peak || Spacewatch || — || align=right | 1.1 km || 
|-id=776 bgcolor=#E9E9E9
| 244776 ||  || — || September 19, 2003 || Anderson Mesa || LONEOS || GEF || align=right | 2.4 km || 
|-id=777 bgcolor=#E9E9E9
| 244777 ||  || — || September 18, 2003 || Palomar || NEAT || — || align=right | 1.3 km || 
|-id=778 bgcolor=#fefefe
| 244778 ||  || — || September 22, 2003 || Desert Eagle || W. K. Y. Yeung || NYS || align=right data-sort-value="0.90" | 900 m || 
|-id=779 bgcolor=#fefefe
| 244779 ||  || — || September 22, 2003 || Haleakala || NEAT || FLO || align=right | 1.4 km || 
|-id=780 bgcolor=#E9E9E9
| 244780 ||  || — || September 23, 2003 || Haleakala || NEAT || — || align=right | 2.4 km || 
|-id=781 bgcolor=#E9E9E9
| 244781 ||  || — || September 18, 2003 || Socorro || LINEAR || — || align=right | 2.1 km || 
|-id=782 bgcolor=#fefefe
| 244782 ||  || — || September 19, 2003 || Kitt Peak || Spacewatch || — || align=right data-sort-value="0.93" | 930 m || 
|-id=783 bgcolor=#E9E9E9
| 244783 ||  || — || September 20, 2003 || Socorro || LINEAR || — || align=right | 4.8 km || 
|-id=784 bgcolor=#E9E9E9
| 244784 ||  || — || September 22, 2003 || Kitt Peak || Spacewatch || — || align=right | 3.4 km || 
|-id=785 bgcolor=#d6d6d6
| 244785 ||  || — || September 20, 2003 || Palomar || NEAT || — || align=right | 4.2 km || 
|-id=786 bgcolor=#fefefe
| 244786 ||  || — || September 21, 2003 || Anderson Mesa || LONEOS || H || align=right | 1.2 km || 
|-id=787 bgcolor=#E9E9E9
| 244787 ||  || — || September 21, 2003 || Anderson Mesa || LONEOS || — || align=right | 3.9 km || 
|-id=788 bgcolor=#d6d6d6
| 244788 ||  || — || September 22, 2003 || Socorro || LINEAR || — || align=right | 6.5 km || 
|-id=789 bgcolor=#fefefe
| 244789 ||  || — || September 25, 2003 || Haleakala || NEAT || — || align=right | 1.8 km || 
|-id=790 bgcolor=#FA8072
| 244790 ||  || — || September 23, 2003 || Palomar || NEAT || — || align=right | 1.0 km || 
|-id=791 bgcolor=#fefefe
| 244791 ||  || — || September 25, 2003 || Haleakala || NEAT || V || align=right | 1.1 km || 
|-id=792 bgcolor=#E9E9E9
| 244792 ||  || — || September 18, 2003 || Kitt Peak || Spacewatch || — || align=right | 2.6 km || 
|-id=793 bgcolor=#d6d6d6
| 244793 ||  || — || September 28, 2003 || Desert Eagle || W. K. Y. Yeung || — || align=right | 5.9 km || 
|-id=794 bgcolor=#fefefe
| 244794 ||  || — || September 25, 2003 || Palomar || NEAT || ERI || align=right | 2.0 km || 
|-id=795 bgcolor=#d6d6d6
| 244795 ||  || — || September 25, 2003 || Palomar || NEAT || HYG || align=right | 4.6 km || 
|-id=796 bgcolor=#E9E9E9
| 244796 ||  || — || September 26, 2003 || Socorro || LINEAR || — || align=right | 2.1 km || 
|-id=797 bgcolor=#E9E9E9
| 244797 ||  || — || September 26, 2003 || Socorro || LINEAR || WIT || align=right | 1.7 km || 
|-id=798 bgcolor=#E9E9E9
| 244798 ||  || — || September 26, 2003 || Socorro || LINEAR || — || align=right | 3.2 km || 
|-id=799 bgcolor=#E9E9E9
| 244799 ||  || — || September 26, 2003 || Socorro || LINEAR || — || align=right | 4.2 km || 
|-id=800 bgcolor=#fefefe
| 244800 ||  || — || September 26, 2003 || Socorro || LINEAR || — || align=right | 1.6 km || 
|}

244801–244900 

|-bgcolor=#E9E9E9
| 244801 ||  || — || September 28, 2003 || Socorro || LINEAR || — || align=right | 1.4 km || 
|-id=802 bgcolor=#E9E9E9
| 244802 ||  || — || September 29, 2003 || Socorro || LINEAR || — || align=right | 1.7 km || 
|-id=803 bgcolor=#E9E9E9
| 244803 ||  || — || September 20, 2003 || Bergisch Gladbac || W. Bickel || AGN || align=right | 1.5 km || 
|-id=804 bgcolor=#E9E9E9
| 244804 ||  || — || September 27, 2003 || Kitt Peak || Spacewatch || BAR || align=right | 1.5 km || 
|-id=805 bgcolor=#fefefe
| 244805 ||  || — || September 28, 2003 || Kitt Peak || Spacewatch || KLI || align=right | 2.7 km || 
|-id=806 bgcolor=#E9E9E9
| 244806 ||  || — || September 29, 2003 || Socorro || LINEAR || — || align=right | 2.7 km || 
|-id=807 bgcolor=#E9E9E9
| 244807 ||  || — || September 20, 2003 || Socorro || LINEAR || EUN || align=right | 2.2 km || 
|-id=808 bgcolor=#fefefe
| 244808 ||  || — || September 21, 2003 || Palomar || NEAT || — || align=right | 1.1 km || 
|-id=809 bgcolor=#E9E9E9
| 244809 ||  || — || September 29, 2003 || Anderson Mesa || LONEOS || — || align=right | 2.6 km || 
|-id=810 bgcolor=#E9E9E9
| 244810 ||  || — || September 27, 2003 || Socorro || LINEAR || WIT || align=right | 1.4 km || 
|-id=811 bgcolor=#d6d6d6
| 244811 ||  || — || September 27, 2003 || Socorro || LINEAR || URS || align=right | 5.9 km || 
|-id=812 bgcolor=#E9E9E9
| 244812 ||  || — || September 28, 2003 || Socorro || LINEAR || — || align=right | 3.6 km || 
|-id=813 bgcolor=#fefefe
| 244813 ||  || — || September 17, 2003 || Kitt Peak || Spacewatch || NYS || align=right | 1.7 km || 
|-id=814 bgcolor=#fefefe
| 244814 ||  || — || September 18, 2003 || Kitt Peak || Spacewatch || — || align=right | 1.1 km || 
|-id=815 bgcolor=#E9E9E9
| 244815 ||  || — || September 20, 2003 || Anderson Mesa || LONEOS || — || align=right | 3.0 km || 
|-id=816 bgcolor=#E9E9E9
| 244816 ||  || — || September 30, 2003 || Kitt Peak || Spacewatch || — || align=right | 1.7 km || 
|-id=817 bgcolor=#E9E9E9
| 244817 ||  || — || September 26, 2003 || Apache Point || SDSS || — || align=right | 4.0 km || 
|-id=818 bgcolor=#d6d6d6
| 244818 ||  || — || September 26, 2003 || Apache Point || SDSS || JLI || align=right | 4.5 km || 
|-id=819 bgcolor=#E9E9E9
| 244819 ||  || — || October 1, 2003 || Kitt Peak || Spacewatch || — || align=right | 2.5 km || 
|-id=820 bgcolor=#E9E9E9
| 244820 ||  || — || October 2, 2003 || Kitt Peak || Spacewatch || — || align=right | 2.5 km || 
|-id=821 bgcolor=#fefefe
| 244821 ||  || — || October 1, 2003 || Anderson Mesa || LONEOS || — || align=right | 1.4 km || 
|-id=822 bgcolor=#E9E9E9
| 244822 ||  || — || October 2, 2003 || Kitt Peak || Spacewatch || — || align=right | 1.4 km || 
|-id=823 bgcolor=#E9E9E9
| 244823 ||  || — || October 3, 2003 || Kitt Peak || Spacewatch || — || align=right | 1.9 km || 
|-id=824 bgcolor=#E9E9E9
| 244824 ||  || — || October 5, 2003 || Kitt Peak || Spacewatch || — || align=right | 1.7 km || 
|-id=825 bgcolor=#E9E9E9
| 244825 ||  || — || October 17, 2003 || Socorro || LINEAR || — || align=right | 4.3 km || 
|-id=826 bgcolor=#fefefe
| 244826 ||  || — || October 20, 2003 || Socorro || LINEAR || H || align=right data-sort-value="0.82" | 820 m || 
|-id=827 bgcolor=#fefefe
| 244827 ||  || — || October 18, 2003 || Palomar || NEAT || H || align=right data-sort-value="0.76" | 760 m || 
|-id=828 bgcolor=#d6d6d6
| 244828 ||  || — || October 19, 2003 || Kitt Peak || Spacewatch || THM || align=right | 3.6 km || 
|-id=829 bgcolor=#E9E9E9
| 244829 ||  || — || October 16, 2003 || Kitt Peak || Spacewatch || — || align=right | 1.6 km || 
|-id=830 bgcolor=#fefefe
| 244830 ||  || — || October 16, 2003 || Haleakala || NEAT || FLO || align=right | 1.4 km || 
|-id=831 bgcolor=#d6d6d6
| 244831 ||  || — || October 17, 2003 || Kitt Peak || Spacewatch || — || align=right | 4.6 km || 
|-id=832 bgcolor=#fefefe
| 244832 ||  || — || October 18, 2003 || Kitt Peak || Spacewatch || MAS || align=right data-sort-value="0.88" | 880 m || 
|-id=833 bgcolor=#E9E9E9
| 244833 ||  || — || October 16, 2003 || Palomar || NEAT || MAR || align=right | 1.6 km || 
|-id=834 bgcolor=#E9E9E9
| 244834 ||  || — || October 16, 2003 || Palomar || NEAT || INO || align=right | 1.6 km || 
|-id=835 bgcolor=#fefefe
| 244835 ||  || — || October 16, 2003 || Anderson Mesa || LONEOS || V || align=right | 1.1 km || 
|-id=836 bgcolor=#E9E9E9
| 244836 ||  || — || October 19, 2003 || Palomar || NEAT || — || align=right | 3.9 km || 
|-id=837 bgcolor=#E9E9E9
| 244837 ||  || — || October 20, 2003 || Kitt Peak || Spacewatch || — || align=right | 2.2 km || 
|-id=838 bgcolor=#fefefe
| 244838 ||  || — || October 20, 2003 || Socorro || LINEAR || — || align=right | 1.5 km || 
|-id=839 bgcolor=#E9E9E9
| 244839 ||  || — || October 20, 2003 || Kitt Peak || Spacewatch || — || align=right | 2.8 km || 
|-id=840 bgcolor=#E9E9E9
| 244840 ||  || — || October 18, 2003 || Palomar || NEAT || — || align=right | 1.8 km || 
|-id=841 bgcolor=#E9E9E9
| 244841 ||  || — || October 19, 2003 || Kitt Peak || Spacewatch || — || align=right | 2.9 km || 
|-id=842 bgcolor=#E9E9E9
| 244842 ||  || — || October 20, 2003 || Socorro || LINEAR || KON || align=right | 3.5 km || 
|-id=843 bgcolor=#E9E9E9
| 244843 ||  || — || October 19, 2003 || Kitt Peak || Spacewatch || — || align=right | 1.7 km || 
|-id=844 bgcolor=#E9E9E9
| 244844 ||  || — || October 20, 2003 || Palomar || NEAT || EUN || align=right | 2.8 km || 
|-id=845 bgcolor=#E9E9E9
| 244845 ||  || — || October 20, 2003 || Kitt Peak || Spacewatch || — || align=right | 3.0 km || 
|-id=846 bgcolor=#d6d6d6
| 244846 ||  || — || October 21, 2003 || Kitt Peak || Spacewatch || LUT || align=right | 4.2 km || 
|-id=847 bgcolor=#fefefe
| 244847 ||  || — || October 20, 2003 || Palomar || NEAT || ERI || align=right | 2.7 km || 
|-id=848 bgcolor=#E9E9E9
| 244848 ||  || — || October 21, 2003 || Palomar || NEAT || — || align=right | 2.7 km || 
|-id=849 bgcolor=#fefefe
| 244849 ||  || — || October 21, 2003 || Socorro || LINEAR || NYS || align=right data-sort-value="0.90" | 900 m || 
|-id=850 bgcolor=#d6d6d6
| 244850 ||  || — || October 16, 2003 || Anderson Mesa || LONEOS || — || align=right | 2.8 km || 
|-id=851 bgcolor=#E9E9E9
| 244851 ||  || — || October 18, 2003 || Anderson Mesa || LONEOS || — || align=right | 1.4 km || 
|-id=852 bgcolor=#E9E9E9
| 244852 ||  || — || October 18, 2003 || Anderson Mesa || LONEOS || — || align=right | 1.9 km || 
|-id=853 bgcolor=#E9E9E9
| 244853 ||  || — || October 19, 2003 || Socorro || LINEAR || — || align=right | 4.7 km || 
|-id=854 bgcolor=#E9E9E9
| 244854 ||  || — || October 20, 2003 || Socorro || LINEAR || — || align=right | 3.6 km || 
|-id=855 bgcolor=#fefefe
| 244855 ||  || — || October 21, 2003 || Socorro || LINEAR || — || align=right | 2.0 km || 
|-id=856 bgcolor=#fefefe
| 244856 ||  || — || October 22, 2003 || Socorro || LINEAR || — || align=right | 3.8 km || 
|-id=857 bgcolor=#d6d6d6
| 244857 ||  || — || October 22, 2003 || Kitt Peak || Spacewatch || — || align=right | 4.3 km || 
|-id=858 bgcolor=#fefefe
| 244858 ||  || — || October 20, 2003 || Palomar || NEAT || — || align=right | 1.1 km || 
|-id=859 bgcolor=#E9E9E9
| 244859 ||  || — || October 20, 2003 || Socorro || LINEAR || — || align=right | 2.1 km || 
|-id=860 bgcolor=#E9E9E9
| 244860 ||  || — || October 20, 2003 || Kitt Peak || Spacewatch || — || align=right | 1.5 km || 
|-id=861 bgcolor=#fefefe
| 244861 ||  || — || October 21, 2003 || Kitt Peak || Spacewatch || V || align=right | 1.1 km || 
|-id=862 bgcolor=#E9E9E9
| 244862 ||  || — || October 21, 2003 || Socorro || LINEAR || — || align=right | 2.3 km || 
|-id=863 bgcolor=#E9E9E9
| 244863 ||  || — || October 22, 2003 || Kitt Peak || Spacewatch || — || align=right | 2.2 km || 
|-id=864 bgcolor=#fefefe
| 244864 ||  || — || October 21, 2003 || Socorro || LINEAR || NYS || align=right | 2.7 km || 
|-id=865 bgcolor=#E9E9E9
| 244865 ||  || — || October 21, 2003 || Socorro || LINEAR || — || align=right | 3.4 km || 
|-id=866 bgcolor=#E9E9E9
| 244866 ||  || — || October 21, 2003 || Socorro || LINEAR || NEM || align=right | 3.0 km || 
|-id=867 bgcolor=#E9E9E9
| 244867 ||  || — || October 22, 2003 || Palomar || NEAT || — || align=right | 3.7 km || 
|-id=868 bgcolor=#E9E9E9
| 244868 ||  || — || October 22, 2003 || Socorro || LINEAR || — || align=right | 4.0 km || 
|-id=869 bgcolor=#E9E9E9
| 244869 ||  || — || October 23, 2003 || Kitt Peak || Spacewatch || — || align=right | 1.6 km || 
|-id=870 bgcolor=#fefefe
| 244870 ||  || — || October 24, 2003 || Kitt Peak || Spacewatch || — || align=right | 1.6 km || 
|-id=871 bgcolor=#E9E9E9
| 244871 ||  || — || October 24, 2003 || Socorro || LINEAR || — || align=right | 1.3 km || 
|-id=872 bgcolor=#E9E9E9
| 244872 ||  || — || October 24, 2003 || Socorro || LINEAR || — || align=right | 2.4 km || 
|-id=873 bgcolor=#E9E9E9
| 244873 ||  || — || October 24, 2003 || Kitt Peak || Spacewatch || — || align=right | 3.1 km || 
|-id=874 bgcolor=#E9E9E9
| 244874 ||  || — || October 25, 2003 || Socorro || LINEAR || EUN || align=right | 2.0 km || 
|-id=875 bgcolor=#E9E9E9
| 244875 ||  || — || October 29, 2003 || Kitt Peak || Spacewatch || DOR || align=right | 3.4 km || 
|-id=876 bgcolor=#d6d6d6
| 244876 ||  || — || October 29, 2003 || Socorro || LINEAR || — || align=right | 6.0 km || 
|-id=877 bgcolor=#E9E9E9
| 244877 ||  || — || October 29, 2003 || Socorro || LINEAR || MRX || align=right | 1.5 km || 
|-id=878 bgcolor=#d6d6d6
| 244878 ||  || — || October 29, 2003 || Catalina || CSS || 3:2 || align=right | 7.9 km || 
|-id=879 bgcolor=#E9E9E9
| 244879 ||  || — || October 29, 2003 || Anderson Mesa || LONEOS || GEF || align=right | 2.1 km || 
|-id=880 bgcolor=#d6d6d6
| 244880 ||  || — || October 22, 2003 || Kitt Peak || M. W. Buie || KOR || align=right | 1.2 km || 
|-id=881 bgcolor=#E9E9E9
| 244881 ||  || — || October 23, 2003 || Kitt Peak || Spacewatch || EUN || align=right | 1.3 km || 
|-id=882 bgcolor=#E9E9E9
| 244882 ||  || — || October 20, 2003 || Kitt Peak || Spacewatch || — || align=right | 2.0 km || 
|-id=883 bgcolor=#E9E9E9
| 244883 ||  || — || October 22, 2003 || Apache Point || SDSS || — || align=right | 1.1 km || 
|-id=884 bgcolor=#E9E9E9
| 244884 ||  || — || October 22, 2003 || Kitt Peak || Spacewatch || — || align=right | 2.0 km || 
|-id=885 bgcolor=#fefefe
| 244885 ||  || — || November 5, 2003 || Socorro || LINEAR || H || align=right data-sort-value="0.92" | 920 m || 
|-id=886 bgcolor=#E9E9E9
| 244886 ||  || — || November 15, 2003 || Palomar || NEAT || — || align=right | 4.0 km || 
|-id=887 bgcolor=#E9E9E9
| 244887 ||  || — || November 16, 2003 || Catalina || CSS || — || align=right | 2.0 km || 
|-id=888 bgcolor=#E9E9E9
| 244888 ||  || — || November 19, 2003 || Mauna Kea || Mauna Kea Obs. || — || align=right | 1.4 km || 
|-id=889 bgcolor=#E9E9E9
| 244889 ||  || — || November 18, 2003 || Palomar || NEAT || — || align=right | 1.8 km || 
|-id=890 bgcolor=#E9E9E9
| 244890 ||  || — || November 18, 2003 || Kitt Peak || Spacewatch || — || align=right | 1.6 km || 
|-id=891 bgcolor=#fefefe
| 244891 ||  || — || November 18, 2003 || Kitt Peak || Spacewatch || — || align=right | 2.0 km || 
|-id=892 bgcolor=#E9E9E9
| 244892 ||  || — || November 19, 2003 || Palomar || NEAT || — || align=right | 2.9 km || 
|-id=893 bgcolor=#E9E9E9
| 244893 ||  || — || November 19, 2003 || Kitt Peak || Spacewatch || — || align=right | 3.2 km || 
|-id=894 bgcolor=#d6d6d6
| 244894 ||  || — || November 19, 2003 || Palomar || NEAT || — || align=right | 3.9 km || 
|-id=895 bgcolor=#E9E9E9
| 244895 ||  || — || November 18, 2003 || Palomar || NEAT || — || align=right | 4.8 km || 
|-id=896 bgcolor=#d6d6d6
| 244896 ||  || — || November 18, 2003 || Kitt Peak || Spacewatch || — || align=right | 4.0 km || 
|-id=897 bgcolor=#E9E9E9
| 244897 ||  || — || November 20, 2003 || Socorro || LINEAR || MAR || align=right | 1.9 km || 
|-id=898 bgcolor=#E9E9E9
| 244898 ||  || — || November 20, 2003 || Socorro || LINEAR || NEM || align=right | 3.1 km || 
|-id=899 bgcolor=#fefefe
| 244899 ||  || — || November 20, 2003 || Socorro || LINEAR || H || align=right | 1.2 km || 
|-id=900 bgcolor=#d6d6d6
| 244900 ||  || — || November 19, 2003 || Socorro || LINEAR || — || align=right | 5.2 km || 
|}

244901–245000 

|-bgcolor=#E9E9E9
| 244901 ||  || — || November 21, 2003 || Socorro || LINEAR || HNS || align=right | 1.7 km || 
|-id=902 bgcolor=#E9E9E9
| 244902 ||  || — || November 22, 2003 || Catalina || CSS || JUN || align=right | 1.5 km || 
|-id=903 bgcolor=#E9E9E9
| 244903 ||  || — || November 19, 2003 || Anderson Mesa || LONEOS || — || align=right | 2.1 km || 
|-id=904 bgcolor=#E9E9E9
| 244904 ||  || — || November 19, 2003 || Anderson Mesa || LONEOS || — || align=right | 2.1 km || 
|-id=905 bgcolor=#fefefe
| 244905 ||  || — || November 20, 2003 || Socorro || LINEAR || SUL || align=right | 4.1 km || 
|-id=906 bgcolor=#E9E9E9
| 244906 ||  || — || November 20, 2003 || Socorro || LINEAR || — || align=right | 1.9 km || 
|-id=907 bgcolor=#E9E9E9
| 244907 ||  || — || November 20, 2003 || Socorro || LINEAR || — || align=right | 2.7 km || 
|-id=908 bgcolor=#d6d6d6
| 244908 ||  || — || November 21, 2003 || Socorro || LINEAR || — || align=right | 3.6 km || 
|-id=909 bgcolor=#d6d6d6
| 244909 ||  || — || November 21, 2003 || Palomar || NEAT || — || align=right | 2.8 km || 
|-id=910 bgcolor=#fefefe
| 244910 ||  || — || November 20, 2003 || Socorro || LINEAR || — || align=right | 1.3 km || 
|-id=911 bgcolor=#E9E9E9
| 244911 ||  || — || November 21, 2003 || Socorro || LINEAR || — || align=right | 3.1 km || 
|-id=912 bgcolor=#E9E9E9
| 244912 ||  || — || November 21, 2003 || Socorro || LINEAR || — || align=right | 1.2 km || 
|-id=913 bgcolor=#E9E9E9
| 244913 ||  || — || November 21, 2003 || Socorro || LINEAR || — || align=right | 2.2 km || 
|-id=914 bgcolor=#E9E9E9
| 244914 ||  || — || November 21, 2003 || Socorro || LINEAR || — || align=right | 2.4 km || 
|-id=915 bgcolor=#E9E9E9
| 244915 ||  || — || November 21, 2003 || Socorro || LINEAR || RAF || align=right | 1.6 km || 
|-id=916 bgcolor=#E9E9E9
| 244916 ||  || — || November 21, 2003 || Socorro || LINEAR || — || align=right | 3.2 km || 
|-id=917 bgcolor=#fefefe
| 244917 ||  || — || November 26, 2003 || Kitt Peak || Spacewatch || — || align=right | 1.7 km || 
|-id=918 bgcolor=#d6d6d6
| 244918 ||  || — || November 26, 2003 || Kitt Peak || Spacewatch || — || align=right | 3.8 km || 
|-id=919 bgcolor=#E9E9E9
| 244919 ||  || — || November 29, 2003 || Socorro || LINEAR || — || align=right | 1.5 km || 
|-id=920 bgcolor=#E9E9E9
| 244920 ||  || — || November 30, 2003 || Kitt Peak || Spacewatch || — || align=right | 1.7 km || 
|-id=921 bgcolor=#d6d6d6
| 244921 ||  || — || November 30, 2003 || Kitt Peak || Spacewatch || 3:2 || align=right | 7.2 km || 
|-id=922 bgcolor=#d6d6d6
| 244922 ||  || — || November 18, 2003 || Palomar || NEAT || — || align=right | 7.0 km || 
|-id=923 bgcolor=#E9E9E9
| 244923 ||  || — || November 20, 2003 || Palomar || NEAT || ADE || align=right | 3.4 km || 
|-id=924 bgcolor=#fefefe
| 244924 ||  || — || November 19, 2003 || Kitt Peak || Spacewatch || — || align=right | 1.2 km || 
|-id=925 bgcolor=#E9E9E9
| 244925 ||  || — || November 23, 2003 || Kitt Peak || M. W. Buie || HOF || align=right | 3.4 km || 
|-id=926 bgcolor=#fefefe
| 244926 ||  || — || November 26, 2003 || Socorro || LINEAR || H || align=right data-sort-value="0.83" | 830 m || 
|-id=927 bgcolor=#E9E9E9
| 244927 ||  || — || November 24, 2003 || Kitt Peak || Spacewatch || — || align=right | 2.7 km || 
|-id=928 bgcolor=#E9E9E9
| 244928 ||  || — || December 1, 2003 || Socorro || LINEAR || — || align=right | 4.3 km || 
|-id=929 bgcolor=#d6d6d6
| 244929 ||  || — || December 14, 2003 || Kitt Peak || Spacewatch || — || align=right | 5.7 km || 
|-id=930 bgcolor=#d6d6d6
| 244930 ||  || — || December 14, 2003 || Kitt Peak || Spacewatch || EOS || align=right | 2.9 km || 
|-id=931 bgcolor=#E9E9E9
| 244931 ||  || — || December 15, 2003 || Socorro || LINEAR || — || align=right | 2.5 km || 
|-id=932 bgcolor=#E9E9E9
| 244932 Méliés ||  ||  || December 15, 2003 || Saint-Sulpice || B. Christophe || — || align=right | 2.8 km || 
|-id=933 bgcolor=#E9E9E9
| 244933 ||  || — || December 18, 2003 || Socorro || LINEAR || GAL || align=right | 2.7 km || 
|-id=934 bgcolor=#d6d6d6
| 244934 ||  || — || December 17, 2003 || Anderson Mesa || LONEOS || — || align=right | 4.2 km || 
|-id=935 bgcolor=#fefefe
| 244935 ||  || — || December 20, 2003 || Socorro || LINEAR || H || align=right data-sort-value="0.83" | 830 m || 
|-id=936 bgcolor=#d6d6d6
| 244936 ||  || — || December 17, 2003 || Socorro || LINEAR || — || align=right | 4.0 km || 
|-id=937 bgcolor=#E9E9E9
| 244937 ||  || — || December 18, 2003 || Socorro || LINEAR || — || align=right | 2.1 km || 
|-id=938 bgcolor=#E9E9E9
| 244938 ||  || — || December 17, 2003 || Anderson Mesa || LONEOS || — || align=right | 2.2 km || 
|-id=939 bgcolor=#E9E9E9
| 244939 ||  || — || December 18, 2003 || Socorro || LINEAR || — || align=right | 2.8 km || 
|-id=940 bgcolor=#E9E9E9
| 244940 ||  || — || December 19, 2003 || Socorro || LINEAR || — || align=right | 3.4 km || 
|-id=941 bgcolor=#E9E9E9
| 244941 ||  || — || December 19, 2003 || Kitt Peak || Spacewatch || — || align=right | 1.3 km || 
|-id=942 bgcolor=#E9E9E9
| 244942 ||  || — || December 21, 2003 || Kitt Peak || Spacewatch || — || align=right | 1.3 km || 
|-id=943 bgcolor=#d6d6d6
| 244943 ||  || — || December 18, 2003 || Socorro || LINEAR || — || align=right | 4.7 km || 
|-id=944 bgcolor=#fefefe
| 244944 ||  || — || December 18, 2003 || Socorro || LINEAR || SVE || align=right | 4.4 km || 
|-id=945 bgcolor=#E9E9E9
| 244945 ||  || — || December 18, 2003 || Socorro || LINEAR || — || align=right | 2.4 km || 
|-id=946 bgcolor=#d6d6d6
| 244946 ||  || — || December 18, 2003 || Socorro || LINEAR || — || align=right | 3.1 km || 
|-id=947 bgcolor=#fefefe
| 244947 ||  || — || December 18, 2003 || Socorro || LINEAR || — || align=right | 1.4 km || 
|-id=948 bgcolor=#d6d6d6
| 244948 ||  || — || December 18, 2003 || Kitt Peak || Spacewatch || — || align=right | 3.5 km || 
|-id=949 bgcolor=#E9E9E9
| 244949 ||  || — || December 19, 2003 || Socorro || LINEAR || — || align=right | 4.8 km || 
|-id=950 bgcolor=#d6d6d6
| 244950 ||  || — || December 19, 2003 || Socorro || LINEAR || — || align=right | 2.9 km || 
|-id=951 bgcolor=#E9E9E9
| 244951 ||  || — || December 22, 2003 || Socorro || LINEAR || — || align=right | 3.3 km || 
|-id=952 bgcolor=#d6d6d6
| 244952 ||  || — || December 23, 2003 || Socorro || LINEAR || — || align=right | 4.7 km || 
|-id=953 bgcolor=#E9E9E9
| 244953 ||  || — || December 24, 2003 || Socorro || LINEAR || — || align=right | 2.3 km || 
|-id=954 bgcolor=#E9E9E9
| 244954 ||  || — || December 27, 2003 || Socorro || LINEAR || — || align=right | 2.5 km || 
|-id=955 bgcolor=#d6d6d6
| 244955 ||  || — || December 27, 2003 || Kitt Peak || Spacewatch || — || align=right | 3.5 km || 
|-id=956 bgcolor=#d6d6d6
| 244956 ||  || — || December 28, 2003 || Socorro || LINEAR || EOS || align=right | 2.6 km || 
|-id=957 bgcolor=#d6d6d6
| 244957 ||  || — || December 28, 2003 || Socorro || LINEAR || — || align=right | 3.9 km || 
|-id=958 bgcolor=#d6d6d6
| 244958 ||  || — || December 28, 2003 || Socorro || LINEAR || — || align=right | 3.6 km || 
|-id=959 bgcolor=#d6d6d6
| 244959 ||  || — || December 28, 2003 || Socorro || LINEAR || LIX || align=right | 4.3 km || 
|-id=960 bgcolor=#d6d6d6
| 244960 ||  || — || December 29, 2003 || Socorro || LINEAR || 7:4 || align=right | 6.5 km || 
|-id=961 bgcolor=#d6d6d6
| 244961 ||  || — || December 29, 2003 || Socorro || LINEAR || EOS || align=right | 3.0 km || 
|-id=962 bgcolor=#E9E9E9
| 244962 ||  || — || December 17, 2003 || Kitt Peak || Spacewatch || — || align=right | 3.0 km || 
|-id=963 bgcolor=#E9E9E9
| 244963 ||  || — || December 18, 2003 || Kitt Peak || Spacewatch || — || align=right | 3.1 km || 
|-id=964 bgcolor=#fefefe
| 244964 ||  || — || January 13, 2004 || Anderson Mesa || LONEOS || H || align=right data-sort-value="0.85" | 850 m || 
|-id=965 bgcolor=#E9E9E9
| 244965 ||  || — || January 15, 2004 || Kitt Peak || Spacewatch || — || align=right | 2.1 km || 
|-id=966 bgcolor=#E9E9E9
| 244966 ||  || — || January 16, 2004 || Kitt Peak || Spacewatch || — || align=right | 1.9 km || 
|-id=967 bgcolor=#d6d6d6
| 244967 ||  || — || January 17, 2004 || Palomar || NEAT || — || align=right | 5.1 km || 
|-id=968 bgcolor=#d6d6d6
| 244968 ||  || — || January 17, 2004 || Palomar || NEAT || ALA || align=right | 6.0 km || 
|-id=969 bgcolor=#E9E9E9
| 244969 ||  || — || January 18, 2004 || Needville || J. Dellinger || — || align=right | 2.9 km || 
|-id=970 bgcolor=#E9E9E9
| 244970 ||  || — || January 18, 2004 || Palomar || NEAT || — || align=right | 5.6 km || 
|-id=971 bgcolor=#d6d6d6
| 244971 ||  || — || January 19, 2004 || Kitt Peak || Spacewatch || — || align=right | 2.8 km || 
|-id=972 bgcolor=#d6d6d6
| 244972 ||  || — || January 21, 2004 || Socorro || LINEAR || — || align=right | 4.8 km || 
|-id=973 bgcolor=#E9E9E9
| 244973 ||  || — || January 19, 2004 || Catalina || CSS || — || align=right | 2.5 km || 
|-id=974 bgcolor=#fefefe
| 244974 ||  || — || January 22, 2004 || Socorro || LINEAR || H || align=right data-sort-value="0.88" | 880 m || 
|-id=975 bgcolor=#E9E9E9
| 244975 ||  || — || January 22, 2004 || Socorro || LINEAR || — || align=right | 3.2 km || 
|-id=976 bgcolor=#d6d6d6
| 244976 ||  || — || January 22, 2004 || Socorro || LINEAR || — || align=right | 3.4 km || 
|-id=977 bgcolor=#FFC2E0
| 244977 ||  || — || January 27, 2004 || Socorro || LINEAR || APOPHA || align=right data-sort-value="0.5" | 500 m || 
|-id=978 bgcolor=#d6d6d6
| 244978 ||  || — || January 22, 2004 || Socorro || LINEAR || EOS || align=right | 2.9 km || 
|-id=979 bgcolor=#d6d6d6
| 244979 ||  || — || January 27, 2004 || Anderson Mesa || LONEOS || — || align=right | 5.3 km || 
|-id=980 bgcolor=#d6d6d6
| 244980 ||  || — || January 27, 2004 || Anderson Mesa || LONEOS || — || align=right | 4.0 km || 
|-id=981 bgcolor=#d6d6d6
| 244981 ||  || — || January 27, 2004 || Goodricke-Pigott || Goodricke-Pigott Obs. || — || align=right | 6.6 km || 
|-id=982 bgcolor=#d6d6d6
| 244982 ||  || — || January 25, 2004 || Haleakala || NEAT || — || align=right | 3.1 km || 
|-id=983 bgcolor=#d6d6d6
| 244983 ||  || — || January 28, 2004 || Socorro || LINEAR || — || align=right | 3.1 km || 
|-id=984 bgcolor=#d6d6d6
| 244984 ||  || — || January 27, 2004 || Kitt Peak || Spacewatch || — || align=right | 4.7 km || 
|-id=985 bgcolor=#fefefe
| 244985 ||  || — || January 31, 2004 || Socorro || LINEAR || H || align=right data-sort-value="0.81" | 810 m || 
|-id=986 bgcolor=#d6d6d6
| 244986 ||  || — || January 28, 2004 || Catalina || CSS || — || align=right | 4.4 km || 
|-id=987 bgcolor=#d6d6d6
| 244987 ||  || — || January 28, 2004 || Catalina || CSS || TIR || align=right | 2.8 km || 
|-id=988 bgcolor=#d6d6d6
| 244988 ||  || — || January 30, 2004 || Socorro || LINEAR || HYG || align=right | 3.5 km || 
|-id=989 bgcolor=#d6d6d6
| 244989 ||  || — || January 29, 2004 || Socorro || LINEAR || — || align=right | 3.4 km || 
|-id=990 bgcolor=#d6d6d6
| 244990 ||  || — || January 30, 2004 || Catalina || CSS || — || align=right | 4.1 km || 
|-id=991 bgcolor=#d6d6d6
| 244991 ||  || — || January 30, 2004 || Kitt Peak || Spacewatch || CHA || align=right | 3.4 km || 
|-id=992 bgcolor=#d6d6d6
| 244992 ||  || — || January 30, 2004 || Socorro || LINEAR || — || align=right | 4.5 km || 
|-id=993 bgcolor=#E9E9E9
| 244993 ||  || — || January 19, 2004 || Kitt Peak || Spacewatch || — || align=right | 1.6 km || 
|-id=994 bgcolor=#d6d6d6
| 244994 ||  || — || January 22, 2004 || Socorro || LINEAR || — || align=right | 3.8 km || 
|-id=995 bgcolor=#E9E9E9
| 244995 ||  || — || January 16, 2004 || Kitt Peak || Spacewatch || — || align=right | 2.2 km || 
|-id=996 bgcolor=#d6d6d6
| 244996 ||  || — || January 19, 2004 || Kitt Peak || Spacewatch || — || align=right | 4.1 km || 
|-id=997 bgcolor=#d6d6d6
| 244997 ||  || — || February 10, 2004 || Palomar || NEAT || — || align=right | 5.0 km || 
|-id=998 bgcolor=#d6d6d6
| 244998 ||  || — || February 10, 2004 || Catalina || CSS || — || align=right | 2.9 km || 
|-id=999 bgcolor=#d6d6d6
| 244999 ||  || — || February 11, 2004 || Kitt Peak || Spacewatch || — || align=right | 3.8 km || 
|-id=000 bgcolor=#d6d6d6
| 245000 ||  || — || February 11, 2004 || Kitt Peak || Spacewatch || — || align=right | 2.7 km || 
|}

References

External links 
 Discovery Circumstances: Numbered Minor Planets (240001)–(245000) (IAU Minor Planet Center)

0244